= MESSENGER =

NASA mission to Mercury (2004–2015)

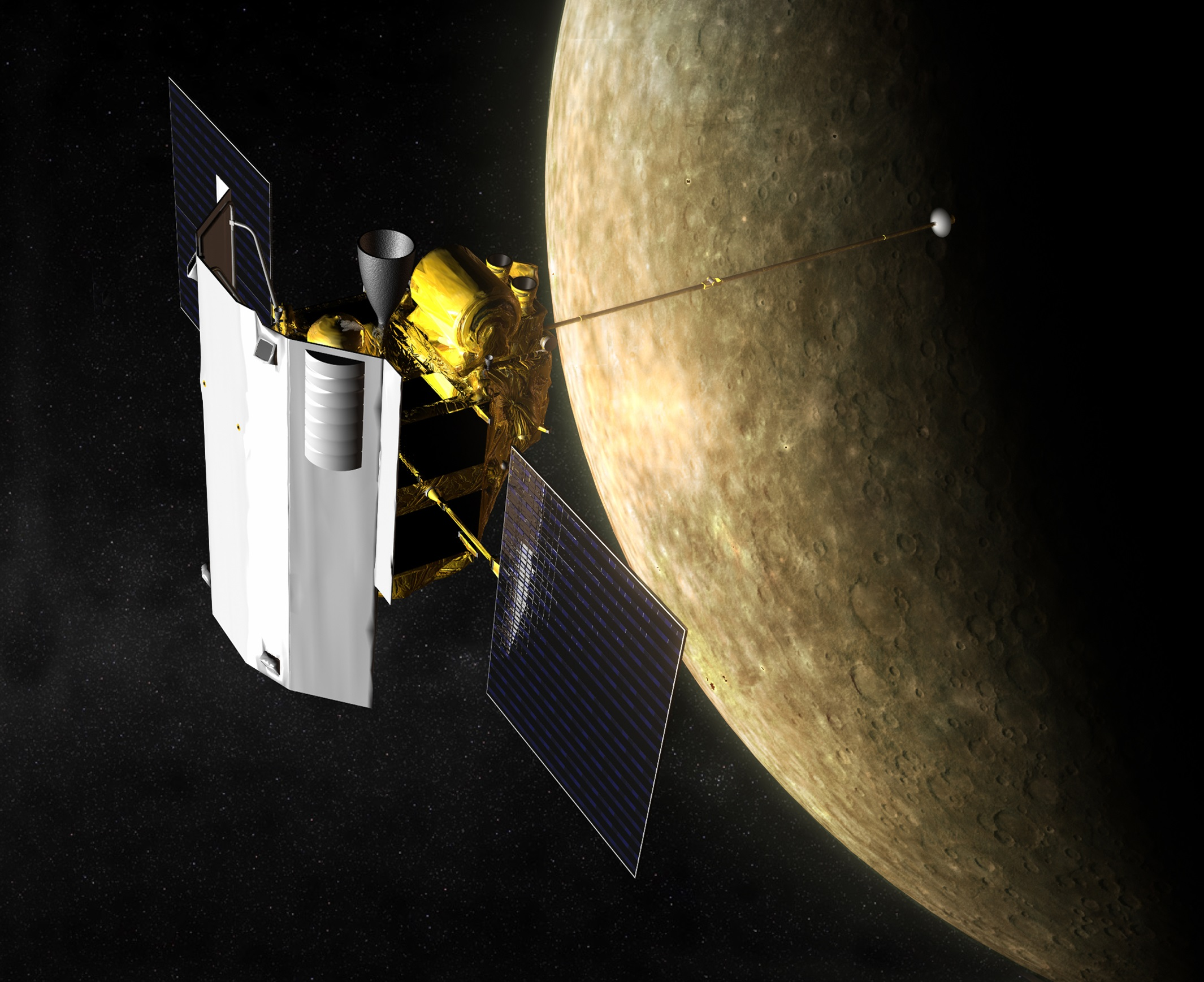
- Artist's rendering of MESSENGER orbiting Mercury
- Mission type: Mercury orbiter
- Operator: NASA
- COSPAR ID: 2004-030A
- SATCAT no.: 28391
- Website: messenger.jhuapl.edu
- Mission duration: Total: 10 years, 8 months and 27 days; At Mercury: 4 years, 1 month and 14 days; En route: 6 years, 7 months and 15 days; Primary mission: 1 year; First extension: 1 year; Second extension: 2 years

Spacecraft properties
- Manufacturer: Applied Physics Laboratory
- Launch mass: 1,107.9 kg (2,443 lb)
- Power: 450 watts

Start of mission
- Launch date: August 3, 2004, 06:15:56 UTC
- Rocket: Delta II 7925H-9.5
- Launch site: Cape Canaveral, SLC-17B
- Entered service: April 4, 2011

End of mission
- Disposal: Crashed into Mercury
- Destroyed: April 30, 2015, 19:26 UTC

Orbital parameters
- Reference system: Hermiocentric
- Perihermion altitude: 200 km (120 mi)
- Apohermion altitude: 10,300 km (6,400 mi)
- Inclination: 80°
- Period: 12 hours
- Epoch: January 1, 2000

Flyby of Earth (gravity assist)
- Closest approach: August 2, 2005
- Distance: 2,347 km (1,458 mi)

Flyby of Venus (gravity assist)
- Closest approach: October 24, 2006
- Distance: 2,990 km (1,860 mi)

Flyby of Venus (gravity assist)
- Closest approach: June 5, 2007
- Distance: 337 km (209 mi)

Flyby of Mercury
- Closest approach: January 14, 2008
- Distance: 200 km (120 mi)

Flyby of Mercury
- Closest approach: October 6, 2008
- Distance: 200 km (120 mi)

Flyby of Mercury
- Closest approach: September 29, 2009
- Distance: 228 km (142 mi)

Mercury orbiter
- Orbital insertion: March 18, 2011, 01:00 UTC
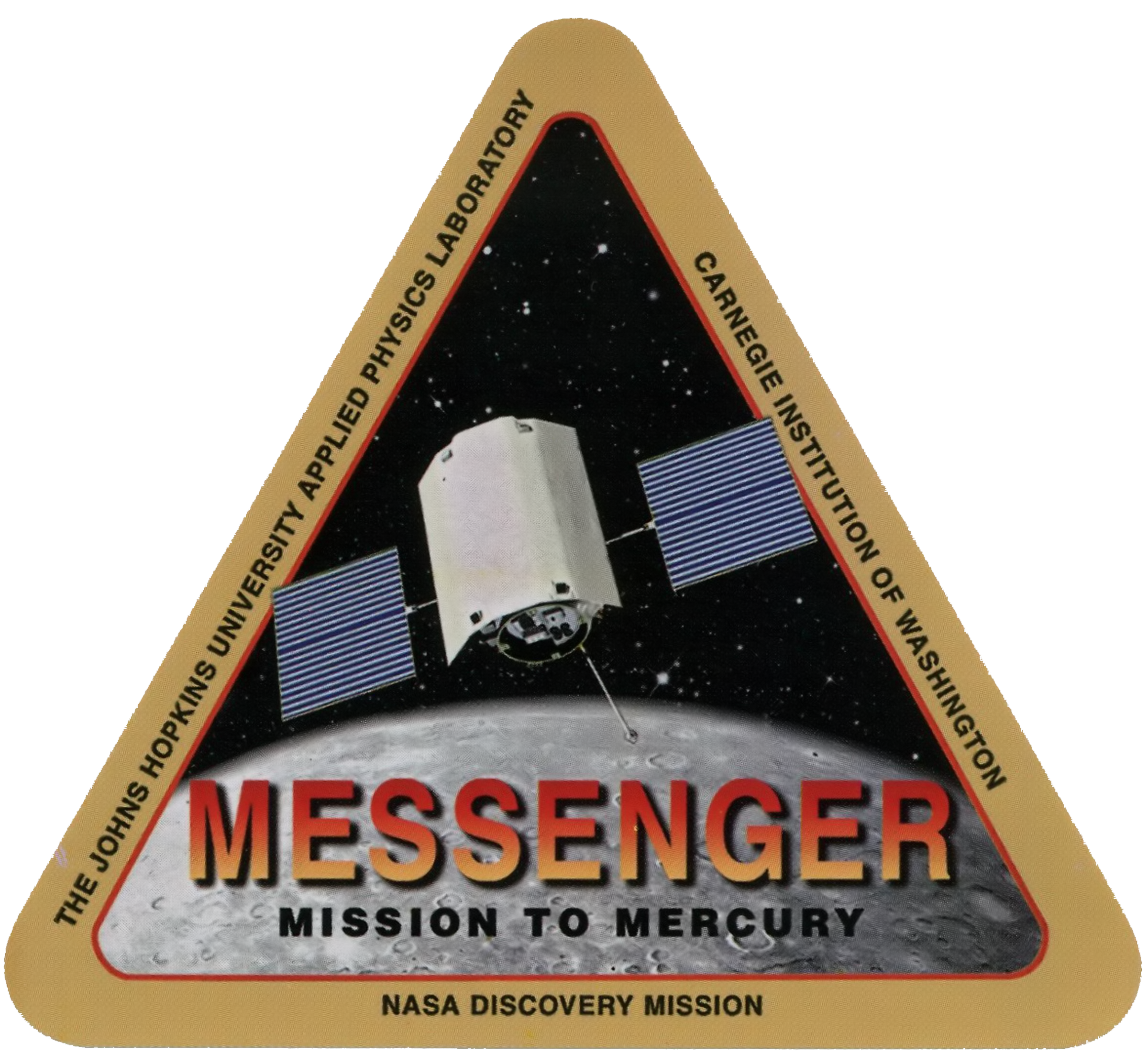
- Discovery Program

MESSENGER was a NASA robotic space probe that orbited the planet Mercury between 2011 and 2015, studying Mercury's chemical composition, geology, and magnetic field. The name is an acronym for Mercury Surface, Space Environment, Geochemistry, and Ranging, and a reference to the messenger god Mercury from Roman mythology.

MESSENGER was launched aboard a Delta II rocket in August 2004. Its path involved a complex series of flybys – the spacecraft flew by Earth once, Venus twice, and Mercury itself three times, allowing it to decelerate relative to Mercury using minimal fuel. During its first flyby of Mercury in January 2008, MESSENGER became the second mission, after Mariner 10 in 1975, to reach Mercury.

MESSENGER entered orbit around Mercury on March 18, 2011, becoming the first spacecraft to do so. It successfully completed its primary mission in 2012. Following two mission extensions, the spacecraft used the last of its maneuvering propellant to deorbit, impacting the surface of Mercury on April 30, 2015.

== Mission overview ==
MESSENGER's formal data collection mission began on April 4, 2011. The primary mission was completed on March 17, 2012, having collected close to 100,000 images. MESSENGER achieved 100% mapping of Mercury on March 6, 2013, and completed its first year-long extended mission on March 17, 2013. The probe's second extended mission lasted for over two years, but as its low orbit degraded, it required reboosts to avoid impact. It conducted its final reboost burns on October 24, 2014, and January 21, 2015, before crashing into Mercury on April 30, 2015.

During its stay in Mercury orbit, the probe's instruments yielded significant data, including a characterization of Mercury's magnetic field and the discovery of water ice at the planet's north pole, which had long been suspected on the basis of Earth-based radar data.

== Mission background ==
=== Previous missions ===
In 1973, Mariner 10 was launched by NASA to make multiple flyby encounters of Venus and Mercury. Mariner 10 provided the first detailed data of Mercury, mapping 40–45% of the surface. Mariner 10's final flyby of Mercury occurred on March 16, 1975. No subsequent close-range observations of the planet would take place for more than 30 years.

=== Proposals for the mission ===
In 1998, a study detailed a proposed mission to send an orbiting spacecraft to Mercury, as the planet was at that point the least-explored of the inner planets. In the years following the Mariner 10 mission, subsequent mission proposals to revisit Mercury had appeared too costly, requiring large quantities of propellant and a heavy lift launch vehicle. Moreover, inserting a spacecraft into orbit around Mercury is difficult, because a probe approaching on a direct path from Earth would be accelerated by the Sun's gravity and pass Mercury far too quickly to orbit it. However, using a trajectory designed by Chen-wan Yen in 1985, the study showed it was possible to execute a Discovery-class mission by using multiple, consecutive gravity assist, 'swingby' maneuvers around Venus and Mercury, in combination with minor propulsive trajectory corrections, to gradually slow the spacecraft and thereby minimize propellant needs.

=== Objectives ===
The MESSENGER mission was designed to study the characteristics and environment of Mercury from orbit. The scientific objectives of the mission were:

- to characterize the chemical composition of Mercury's surface.
- to study the planet's geologic history.
- to elucidate the nature of the global magnetic field (magnetosphere).
- to determine the size and state of the core.
- to determine the volatile inventory at the poles.
- to study the nature of Mercury's exosphere.

== Spacecraft design ==
Interactive 3D model of MESSENGER

The MESSENGER spacecraft was designed and built at the Johns Hopkins University Applied Physics Laboratory. Science operations were managed by Sean Solomon as principal investigator, and mission operations were also conducted at JHU/APL. The MESSENGER bus measured 1.85 meters (73 in) tall, 1.42 m (56 in) wide, and 1.27 m (50 in) deep. The bus was primarily constructed with four graphite fiber / cyanate ester composite panels that supported the propellant tanks, the large velocity adjust (LVA) thruster, attitude monitors and correction thrusters, the antennas, the instrument pallet, and a large ceramic-cloth sunshade, measuring 2.5 m (8.2 ft) tall and 2 m (6.6 ft) wide, for passive thermal control. At launch, the spacecraft weighed approximately 1,100 kilograms (2,400 lb) with its full load of propellant. MESSENGER's total mission cost, including the cost of the spacecraft's construction, was estimated at under US$450 million.

=== Attitude control and propulsion ===
Main propulsion was provided by the 645 N, 317 sec. I_{sp} bipropellant (hydrazine and nitrogen tetroxide) large velocity assist (LVA) thruster. The model used was the LEROS 1b, developed and manufactured at AMPAC‐ISP's Westcott works, in the United Kingdom. The spacecraft was designed to carry 607.8 kilograms (1,340 lb) of propellant and helium pressurizer for the LVA.

Four 22 N (4.9 lb_{f}) monopropellant thrusters provided spacecraft steering during main thruster burns, and twelve 4.4 N (1.0 lb_{f}) monopropellant thrusters were used for attitude control. For precision attitude control, a reaction wheel attitude control system was also included. Information for attitude control was provided by star trackers, an inertial measurement unit and six Sun sensors.

=== Communications ===
The probe included two small deep space transponders for communications with the Deep Space Network and three kinds of antennas: a high gain phased array whose main beam could be electronically steered in one plane, a medium-gain "fan-beam" antenna and a low gain horn with a broad pattern. The high gain antenna was used as transmit-only at 8.4 GHz, the medium-gain and low gain antennas transmit at 8.4 GHz and receive at 7.2 GHz, and all three antennas operate with right-hand circularly polarized (RHCP) radiation. One of each of these antennas was mounted on the front of the probe facing the Sun, and one of each was mounted to the back of the probe facing away from the Sun.

=== Power ===
The space probe was powered by a two-panel gallium arsenide/germanium solar array providing an average of 450 watts while in Mercury orbit. Each panel was rotatable and included optical solar reflectors to balance the temperature of the array. Power was stored in a common-pressure-vessel, 23-ampere-hour nickel–hydrogen battery, with 11 vessels and two cells per vessel.

=== Computer and software ===
The spacecraft's onboard computer system was contained in an Integrated Electronics Module (IEM), a device that combined core avionics into a single box. The computer featured two radiation-hardened IBM RAD6000s, a 25 megahertz main processor, and a 10 MHz fault protection processor. For redundancy, the spacecraft carried a pair of identical IEMs. For data storage, the spacecraft carried two solid-state recorders able to store up to one gigabyte each. The IBM RAD6000 main processor collected, compressed, and stored data from MESSENGER's instruments for later playback to Earth.

MESSENGER used a software suite called SciBox to simulate its orbit and instruments, in order to "choreograph the complicated process of maximizing the scientific return from the mission and minimizing conflicts between instrument observations, while at the same time meeting all spacecraft constraints on pointing, data downlink rates, and onboard data storage capacity."

=== Scientific instruments ===
==== Mercury Dual Imaging System (MDIS) ====
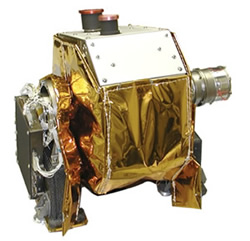

Included two CCD cameras, a narrow-angle camera (NAC) and a wide-angle camera (WAC) mounted to a pivoting platform. The camera system provided a complete map of the surface of Mercury at a resolution of 250 meters/pixel (820 ft/pixel), and images of regions of geologic interest at 20–50 meters/pixel (66–164 ft/pixel). Color imaging was possible only with the narrow-band filter wheel attached to the wide-angle camera.

Objectives:

- Flyby Phase:
  - Acquisition of near-global coverage at ≈500 meters/pixel (1,600 ft/pixel).
  - Multispectral mapping at ≈2 kilometers/pixel (1.2 mi/pixel).
- Orbital Phase:
  - A nadir-looking monochrome global photomosaic at moderate solar incidence angles (55°–75°) and 250 meters/pixel (820 ft/pixel) or better sampling resolution.
  - A 25°-off-nadir mosaic to complement the nadir-looking mosaic for global stereo mapping.
  - Completion of the multispectral mapping begun during the flybys.
  - High-resolution (20–50 meters/pixel (66–164 ft/pixel)) image strips across features representative of major geologic units and structures.

Filters

Wide Angle Camera Filters
Name (pos)	Wavelength	Sensitivity
Clear (2, B)	400–1000 nm
Violet (6, F)	420–440 nm
Blue (3, C)	465–485 nm
Green (4, D)	555–565 nm
Far Red (1, A)	695–705 nm
N-IR (7, G)	745–755 nm
N-IR (12, L)	825–835 nm	N/A
N-IR (10, J)	895–905 nm	N/A
N-IR (8, H)	945–950 nm	N/A
N-IR (9, I)	980–1010 nm	N/A
N-IR (11, K)	975–1045 nm	N/A

Principal investigator: Scott Murchie / Johns Hopkins University

==== Gamma-Ray Spectrometer (GRS) ====
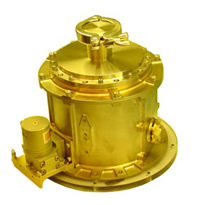

Measured gamma-ray emissions from the surface of Mercury to determine the planet's composition by detecting certain elements (oxygen, silicon, sulfur, iron, hydrogen, potassium, thorium, uranium) to a depth of 10 cm.

Objectives:

- Provide surface abundances of major elements.
- Provide surface abundances of Fe, Si, and K, infer alkali depletion from K abundances, and provide abundance limits on H (water ice) and S (if present) at the poles.
- Map surface element abundances where possible, and otherwise provide surface-averaged abundances or establish upper limits.

Principal investigator: William Boynton / University of Arizona

==== Neutron Spectrometer (NS) ====
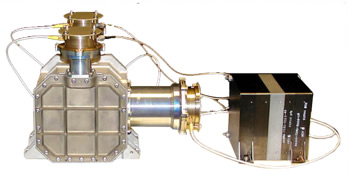

Determined the hydrogen mineral composition to a depth of 40 cm by detecting low-energy neutrons resulting from the collision of cosmic rays with the minerals.

Objectives:

- Establish and map the abundance of hydrogen over most of the northern hemisphere of Mercury.
- Investigate the possible presence of water ice within and near permanently shaded craters near the north pole.
- Provide secondary evidence to aid in interpreting GRS measured gamma-ray line strengths in terms of elemental abundances.
- Outline surface domains at the base of both northern and southern cusps of the magnetosphere where the solar wind can implant hydrogen in surface material.

Principal investigator: William Boynton / University of Arizona

==== X-Ray Spectrometer (XRS) ====
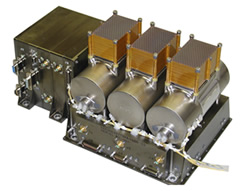
X-Ray spectrometer

Mapped mineral composition within the top millimeter of the surface on Mercury by detecting X-ray spectral lines from magnesium, aluminum, sulphur, calcium, titanium, and iron, in the 1–10 keV range.

Objectives:

- Determine the history of the formation of Mercury
- Characterize the composition of surface elements by measuring the X-ray emissions induced by the incident solar flux.

Principal investigator: George Ho / APL

==== Magnetometer (MAG) ====
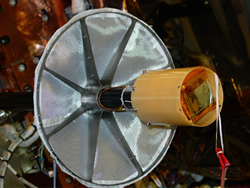

Measured the magnetic field around Mercury in detail to determine the strength and average position of the field.

Objectives:

- Investigate the structure of Mercury's magnetic field and its interaction with the solar wind.
- Characterize the geometry and time variability of the magnetospheric field.
- Detect wave-particle interactions with the magnetosphere.
- Observe magnetotail dynamics, including phenomena possibly analogous to substorms in the Earth's magnetosphere.
- Characterize the magnetopause structure and dynamics.
- Characterize field-aligned currents that link the planet with the magnetosphere.

Principal investigator: Mario Acuna / NASA Goddard Space Flight Center

==== Mercury Laser Altimeter (MLA) ====
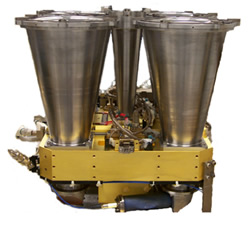

Provided detailed information regarding the height of landforms on the surface of Mercury by detecting the light of an infrared laser as the light bounced off the surface.

Objectives:

- Provide a high-precision topographic map of the high northern latitude regions.
- Measure the long-wavelength topographic features at mid-to-low northern latitudes.
- Determine topographic profiles across major geologic features in the northern hemisphere.
- Detect and quantify the planet's forced physical librations by tracking the motion of large-scale topographic features as a function of time.
- Measure the surface reflectivity of Mercury at the MLA operating wavelength of 1,064 nanometers.

Principal investigator: David Smith / GSFC

==== Mercury Atmospheric and Surface Composition Spectrometer (MASCS) ====
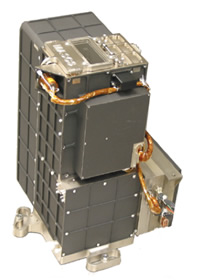

Determined the characteristics of the tenuous atmosphere surrounding Mercury by measuring ultraviolet light emissions, and ascertained the prevalence of iron and titanium minerals on the surface by measuring the reflectance of infrared light.

Objectives:

- Characterize the composition, structure, and temporal behavior of the exosphere.
- Investigate the processes that generate and maintain the exosphere.
- Determine the relationship between exospheric and surface composition.
- Search for polar deposits of volatile material, and determine how are the accumulation of these deposits are related to exospheric processes.

Principal investigator: William McClintock / University of Colorado

==== Energetic Particle and Plasma Spectrometer (EPPS) ====
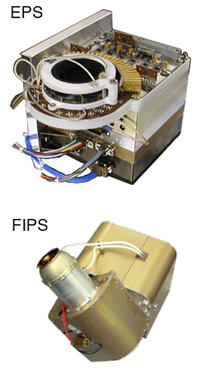
Energetic Particle Spectrometer (EPS) and Fast Imaging Plasma Spectrometer (FIPS) sensors

Measured the charged particles in the magnetosphere around Mercury using an Energetic Particle Spectrometer (EPS) and the charged particles that come from the surface using a Fast Imaging Plasma Spectrometer (FIPS). EPS measured ions (H to Fe) from around 15 keV/nucleon to around 3 MeV/nucleon and electrons between 15 keV and 1 MeV. FIPS measured ions in the range of energy-per-charge from < 50 eV/Q upto 20 keV/Q.

Objectives:

- Determine the structure of the planet's magnetic field.
- Characterize exosphere neutrals and accelerated magnetospheric ions.
- Determine the composition of the radar-reflective materials at Mercury's poles.
- Determine the electrical properties of the crust/atmosphere/environment interface.
- Determine characteristics of the dynamics of Mercury's magnetosphere and their relationships to external drivers and their internal conditions.
- Measure interplanetary plasma properties in cruise and in Mercury vicinity.

Principal investigator: Barry Mauk / APL

==== Radio Science (RS) ====
Measured the gravity of Mercury and the state of the planetary core by utilizing the spacecraft's positioning data.

Objectives:

- Determine the position of the spacecraft during both the cruise and orbital phases of the mission.
- Observe gravitational perturbations from Mercury to investigate the spatial variations of density within the planet's interior, and a time-varying component in Mercury's gravity to quantify the amplitude of Mercury's libration.
- Provide precise measurements of the range of the MESSENGER spacecraft to the surface of Mercury for determining proper altitude mapping with the MLA.

Principal investigator: David Smith / NASA Goddard Space Flight Center

Images of the spacecraft

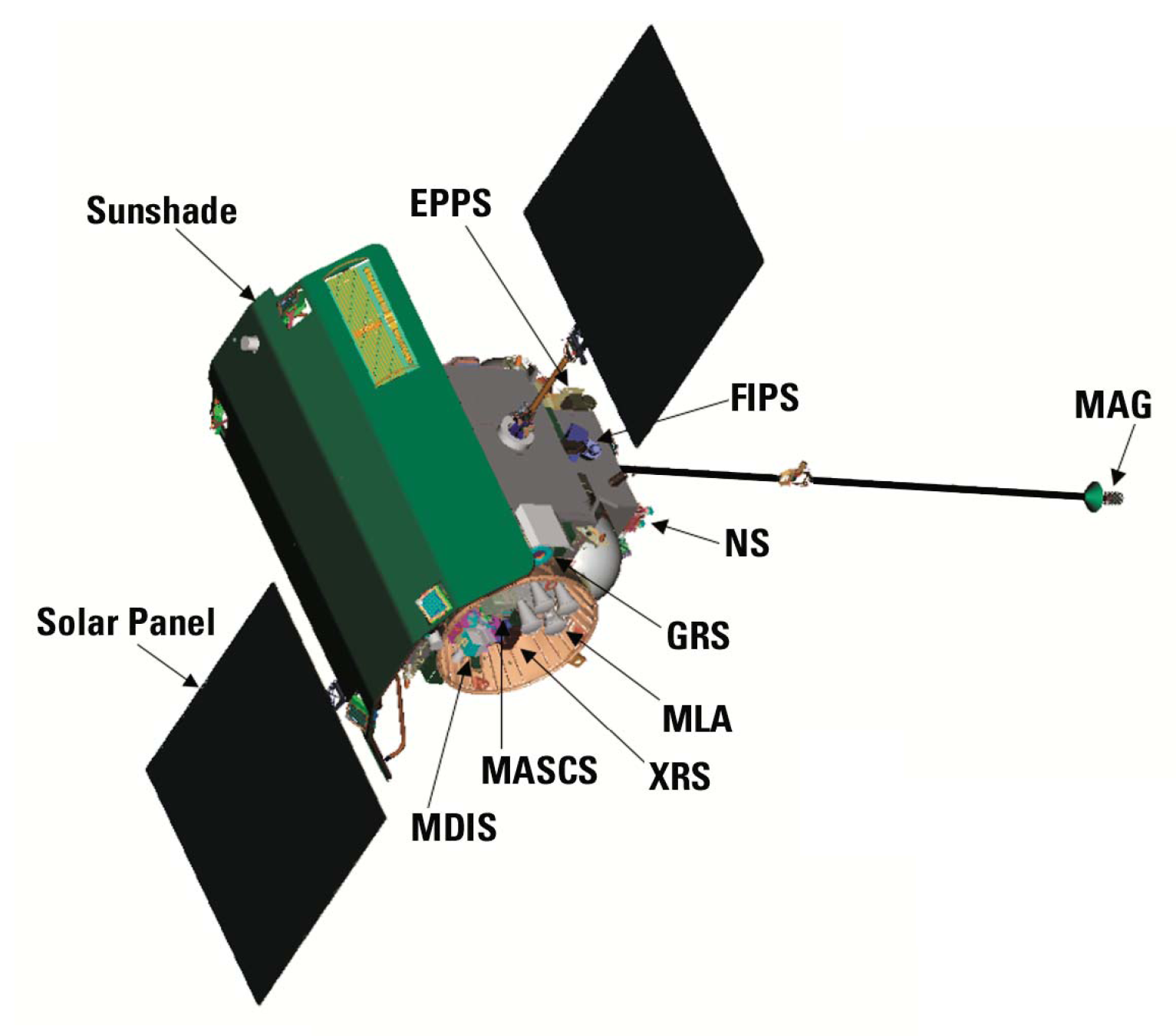
Diagram of MESSENGER.

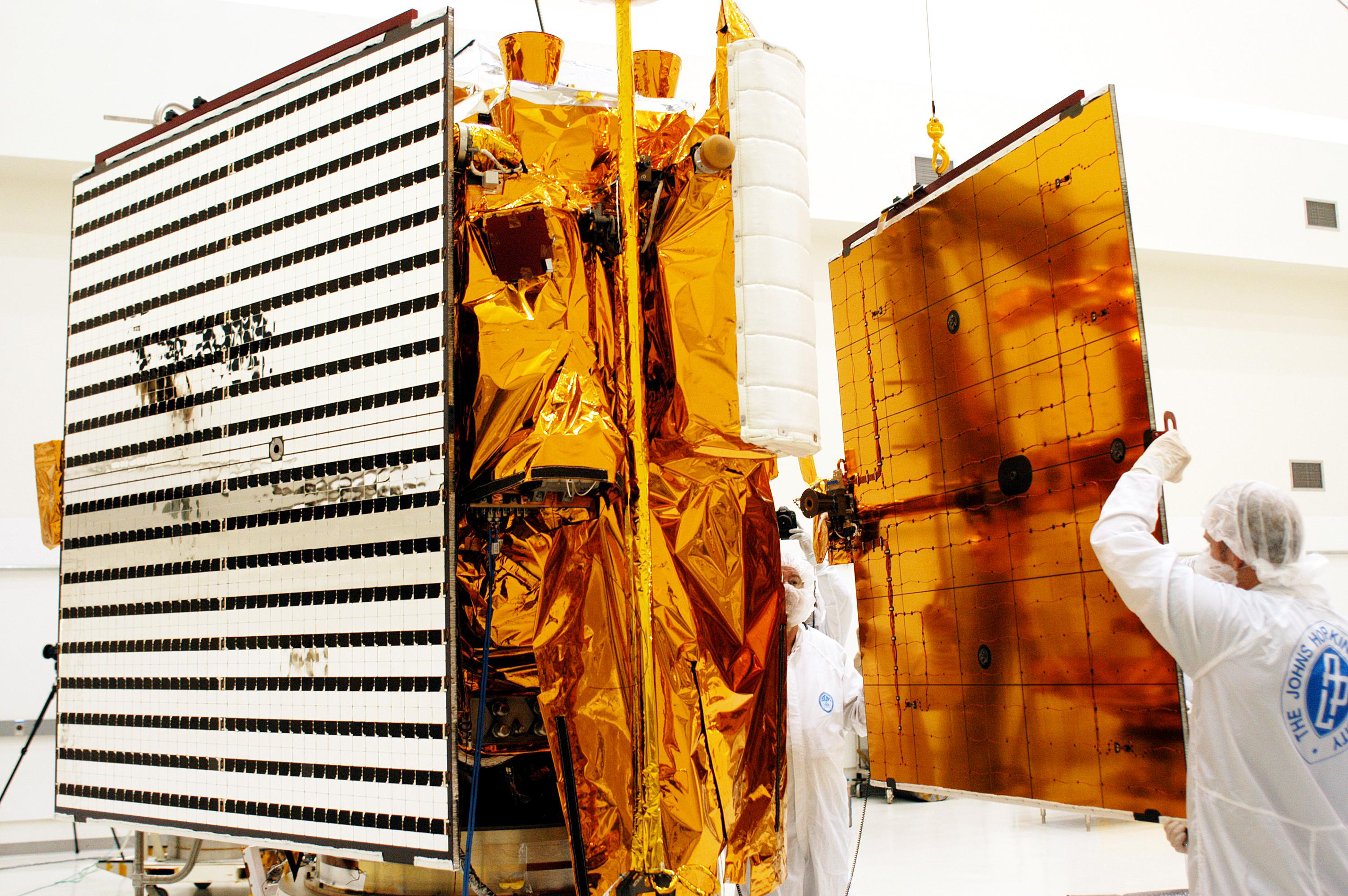
The assembly of MESSENGER's solar panels by APL technicians.

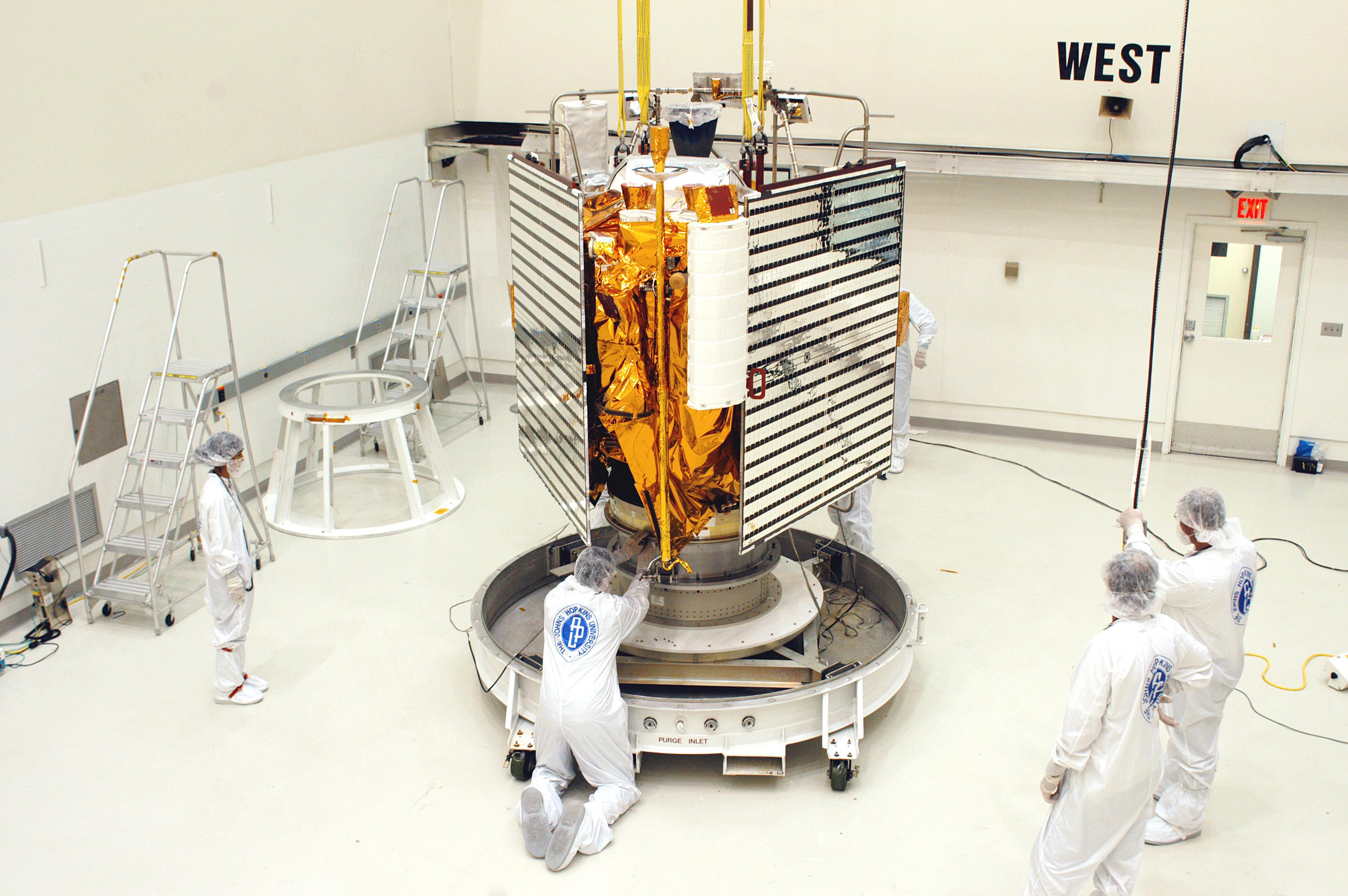
Technicians prepare MESSENGER for transfer to a hazardous processing facility.

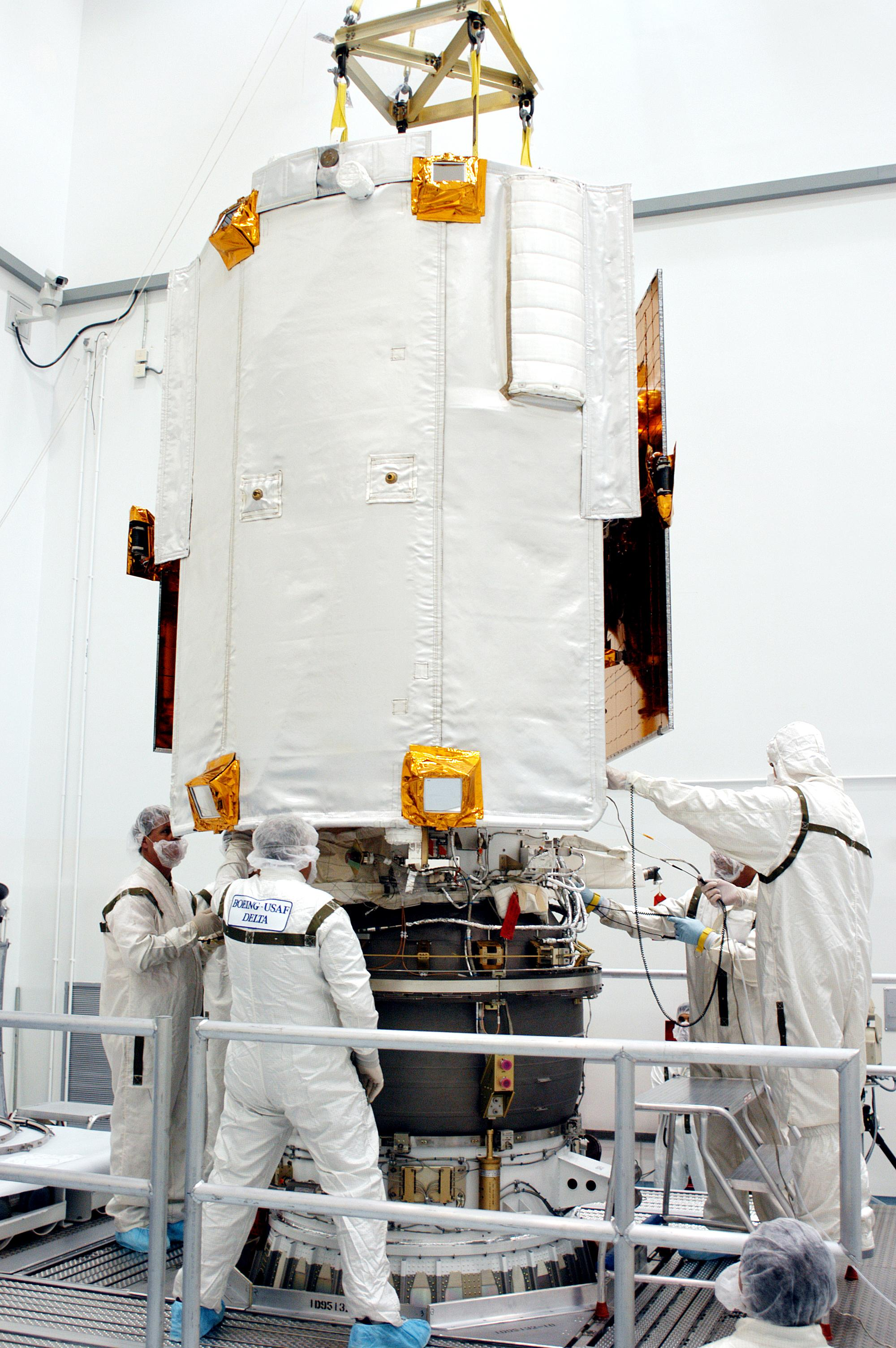
Attachment of the PAM to MESSENGER. The ceramic-cloth sunshade is prominent in this view.

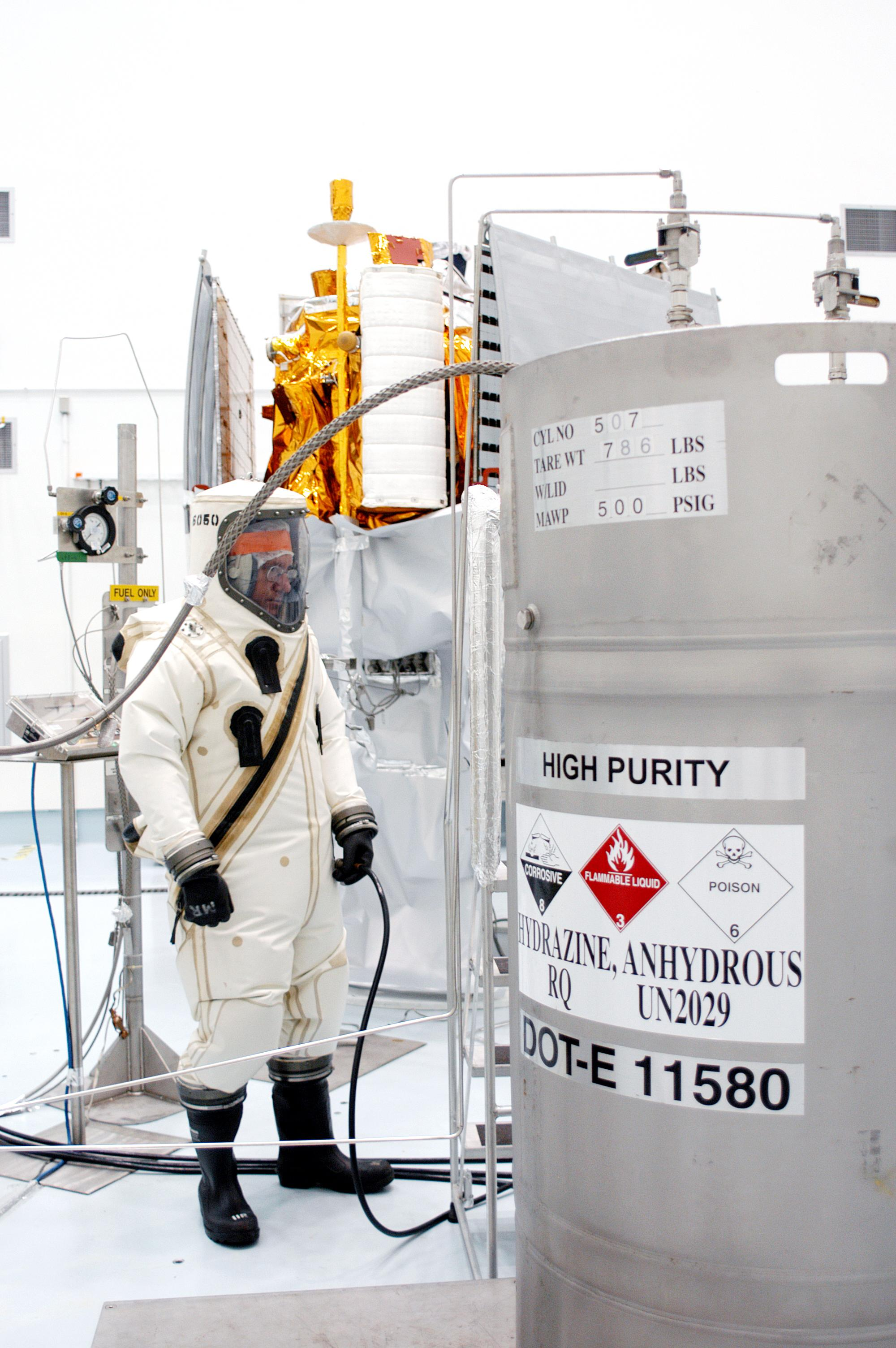
A suited worker looks over the hydrazine fuel supply to be loaded in MESSENGER.

== Mission profile ==
Timeline of key events

Date
Event

August 3, 2004
Spacecraft launched at 06:15:56 UTC
August 2, 2005

Flyby encounter with Earth
Time	Event
August 2, 2005
13:00:00	Rotate spacecraft (turning sunshade toward the Sun)
13:16:00	Energetic Particle Spectrometer begins Earth observations.
13:38:00	Start MDIS color images of South America (set 1).
16:55:00	Start MDIS color images of South America (set 2).
19:13:08	Earth closest approach at 2,348 km.
20:20:00	Rotate spacecraft (sunshade away from the Sun)
20:20:00	Start MDIS color imaging sequence of Amazon Basin
22:16:00	Start MDIS color image sequence for departure "movie".
August 3, 2005
23:38:00	End MDIS color image sequence for departure "movie".

October 24, 2006

Flyby encounters with Venus
Time	Event
October 24, 2006	First encounter with Venus
08:34:00	Venus closest approach at 2,987 km.
08:52:00	Venus occultation entry.
14:15:00	Venus occultation exit.
June 5, 2007	Second encounter with Venus
23:08:00	Venus closest approach at 313 km.

January 14, 2008

Flyby encounters with Mercury
Time	Event
January 14, 2008	First encounter with Mercury
19:04:39	Mercury closest approach at 200 km
October 2, 2008	Second encounter with Mercury
03:30:00	First of eight Optical Navigation images taken on approach.
October 5, 2008
18:00:00	Last of eight Optical Navigation images taken on approach.
22:25:00	Start encounter imaging sequence, beacon-only tracking of probe begins.
October 6, 2008
08:25:00	Mercury shadow entry
08:40:00	Mercury closest approach at 200 km
08:42:00	Mercury shadow exit
October 7, 2010
05:43:00	Start playback of data
September 28, 2009	Third encounter with Mercury
14:24:00	Start encounter imaging sequence, beacon-only tracking of probe begins.
September 29, 2009
21:41:00	Mercury shadow entry
21:55:00	Mercury closest approach at 228 km
21:59:00	Mercury shadow exit
22:03:00	Mercury occultation entry
22:54:00	Mercury occultation exit
03:32:00	Start playback of data

March 18, 2011
Mercury orbital insertion
March 17, 2012
Commencement of first extended mission
March 17, 2013
Completion of first extended mission/
Commencement of second extended mission
April 30, 2015
End of mission

=== Launch and trajectory ===
The MESSENGER probe was launched on August 3, 2004, at 06:15:56 UTC by NASA from Space Launch Complex 17B at the Cape Canaveral Air Force Station in Florida, aboard a Delta II 7925 launch vehicle. The complete burn sequence lasted 57 minutes bringing the spacecraft into a heliocentric orbit, with a final velocity of 10.68 km/s (6.64 miles/s) and sending the probe into a 7.9 billion-kilometer (4.9 billion mi) trajectory that took 6 years, 7 months and 16 days before its orbital insertion on March 18, 2011.

Traveling to Mercury and entering orbit requires an extremely large velocity change (see delta-v) because Mercury's orbit is deep in the Sun's gravity well. On a direct course from Earth to Mercury, a spacecraft is constantly accelerated as it falls toward the Sun, and will arrive at Mercury with a velocity too high to achieve orbit without excessive use of fuel. For planets with an atmosphere, such as Venus and Mars, spacecraft can minimize their fuel consumption upon arrival by using friction with the atmosphere to enter orbit (aerocapture), or can briefly fire their rocket engines to enter into orbit followed by a reduction of the orbit by aerobraking. However, the tenuous atmosphere of Mercury is far too thin for these maneuvers. Instead, MESSENGER extensively used gravity assist maneuvers at Earth, Venus, and Mercury to reduce the speed relative to Mercury, then used its large rocket engine to enter into an elliptical orbit around the planet. The multi-flyby process greatly reduced the amount of propellant necessary to slow the spacecraft, but at the cost of prolonging the trip by many years and to a total distance of 7.9 billion kilometers (4.9 billion miles).

Several planned thruster firings en route to Mercury were unnecessary, because these fine course adjustments were performed using solar radiation pressure acting on MESSENGER's solar panels. To further minimize the amount of necessary propellant, the spacecraft orbital insertion targeted a highly elliptical orbit around Mercury.

The elongated orbit had two other benefits: It allowed the spacecraft time to cool after the times it was between the hot surface of Mercury and the Sun, and also it allowed the spacecraft to measure the effects of solar wind and the magnetic fields of the planet at various distances while still allowing close-up measurements and photographs of the surface and exosphere. The spacecraft was originally scheduled to launch during a 12-day window that beginning May 11, 2004. On March 26, 2004, NASA announced the launch would be moved to a later, 15-day launch window beginning July 30, 2004, to allow for further testing of the spacecraft. This change significantly altered the trajectory of the mission and delayed the arrival at Mercury by two years. The original plan called for three fly-by maneuvers past Venus, with Mercury orbit insertion scheduled for 2009. The trajectory was changed to include one Earth flyby, two Venus flybys, and three Mercury flybys before orbit insertion on March 18, 2011.

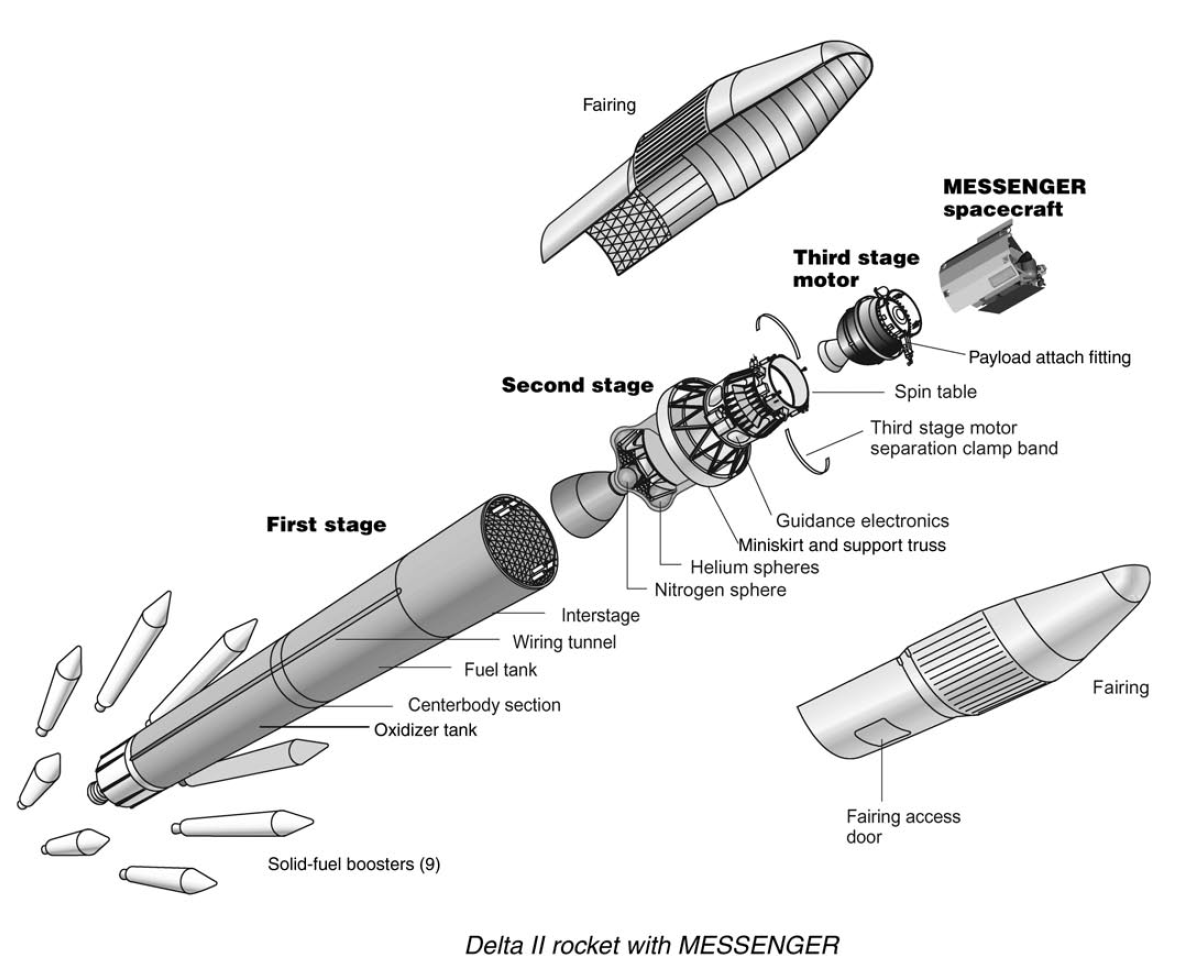
Exploded diagram of Delta II launch vehicle with MESSENGER

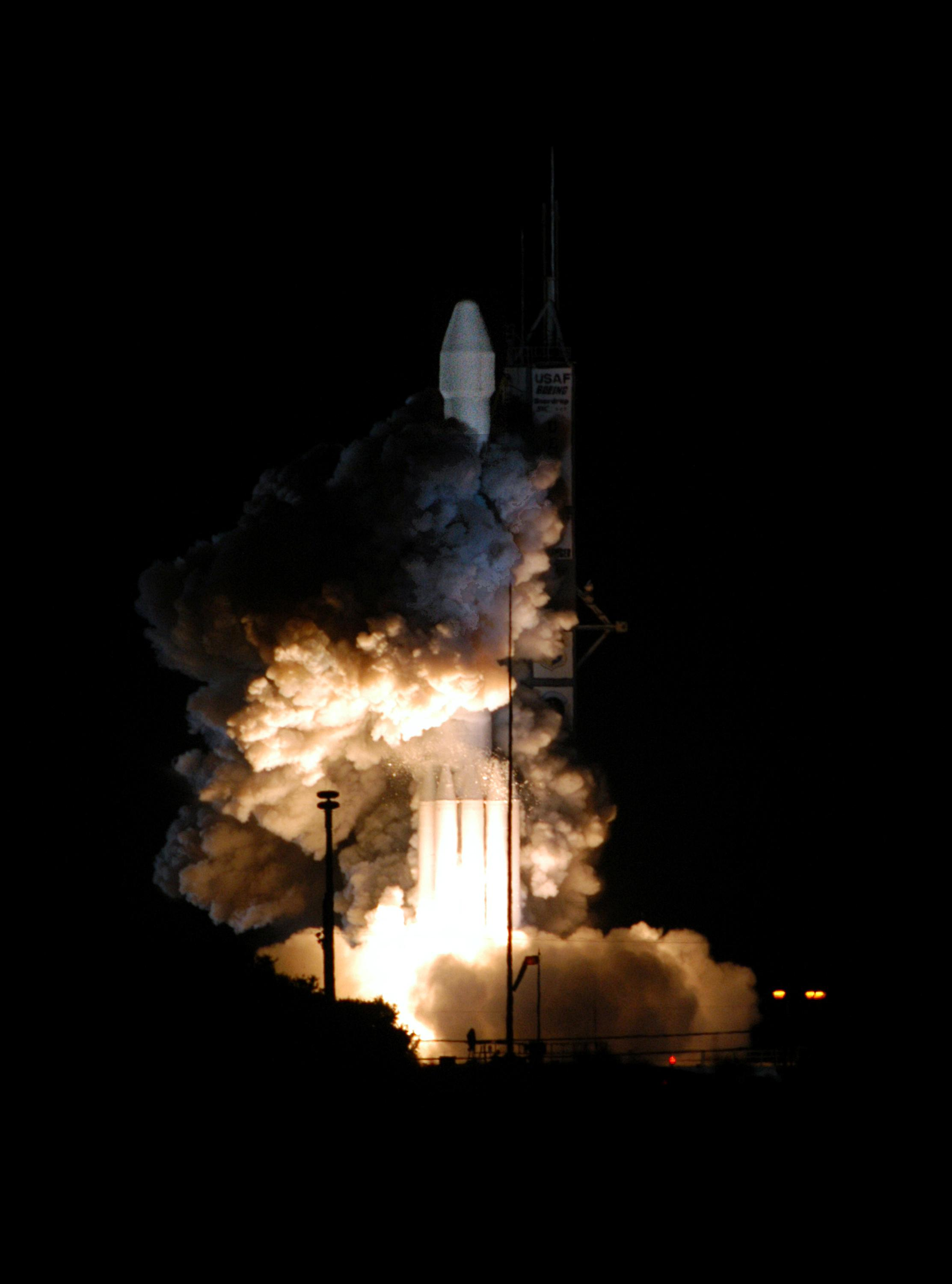
The launch of MESSENGER on a Delta II launch vehicle.

Animation of MESSENGER's trajectory from August 3, 2004, to May 1, 2015
MESSENGER · Earth · Mercury · Venus

Interplanetary trajectory of the MESSENGER orbiter.

=== Earth flyby ===
MESSENGER performed an Earth flyby one year after launch, on August 2, 2005, with the closest approach at 19:13 UTC at an altitude of 2,347 kilometers (1,458 statute miles) over central Mongolia. On December 12, 2005, a 524-second-long burn (Deep-Space Maneuver or DSM-1) of the large thruster adjusted the trajectory for the upcoming Venus flyby by 316 m/s.

During the Earth flyby, the MESSENGER team imaged the Earth and Moon using MDIS and checked the status of several other instruments observing the atmospheric and surface compositions and testing the magnetosphere and determining that all instruments tested were working as expected. This calibration period was intended to ensure accurate interpretation of data when the spacecraft entered orbit around Mercury. Ensuring that the instruments functioned correctly at such an early stage in the mission allowed opportunity for multiple minor errors to be dealt with.

The Earth flyby was used to investigate the flyby anomaly, where some spacecraft have been observed to have trajectories that differ slightly from those predicted. However no anomaly was observed in MESSENGER's flyby.

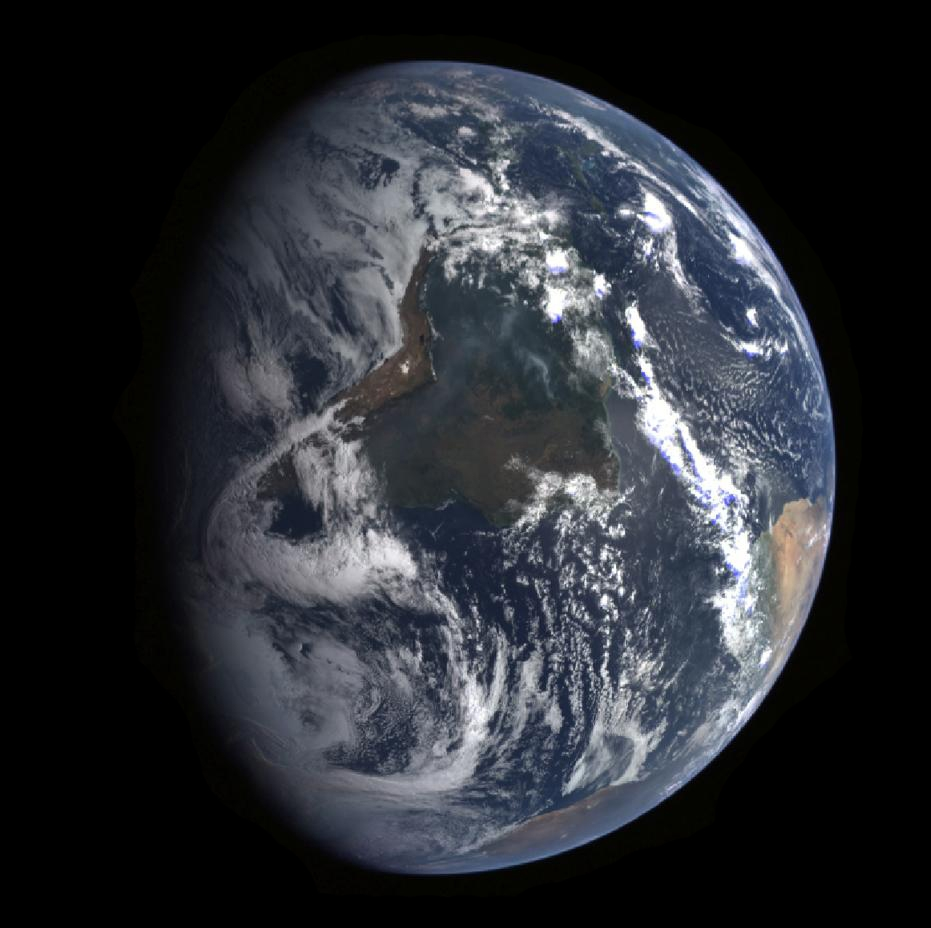
A view of Earth from MESSENGER during its Earth flyby.

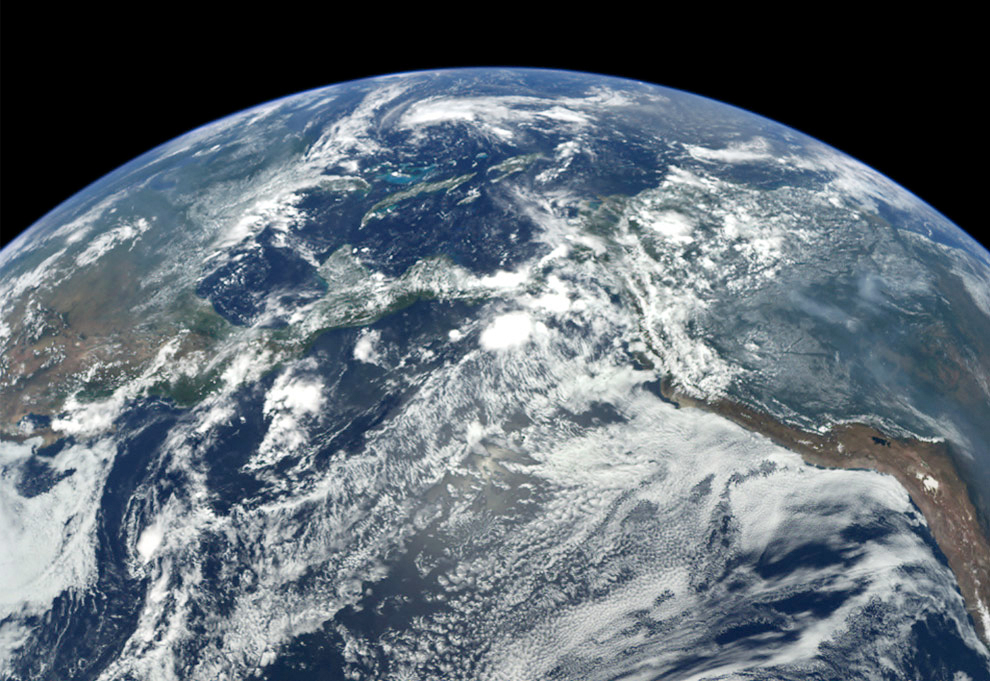
A view of Earth from MESSENGER during its Earth flyby.

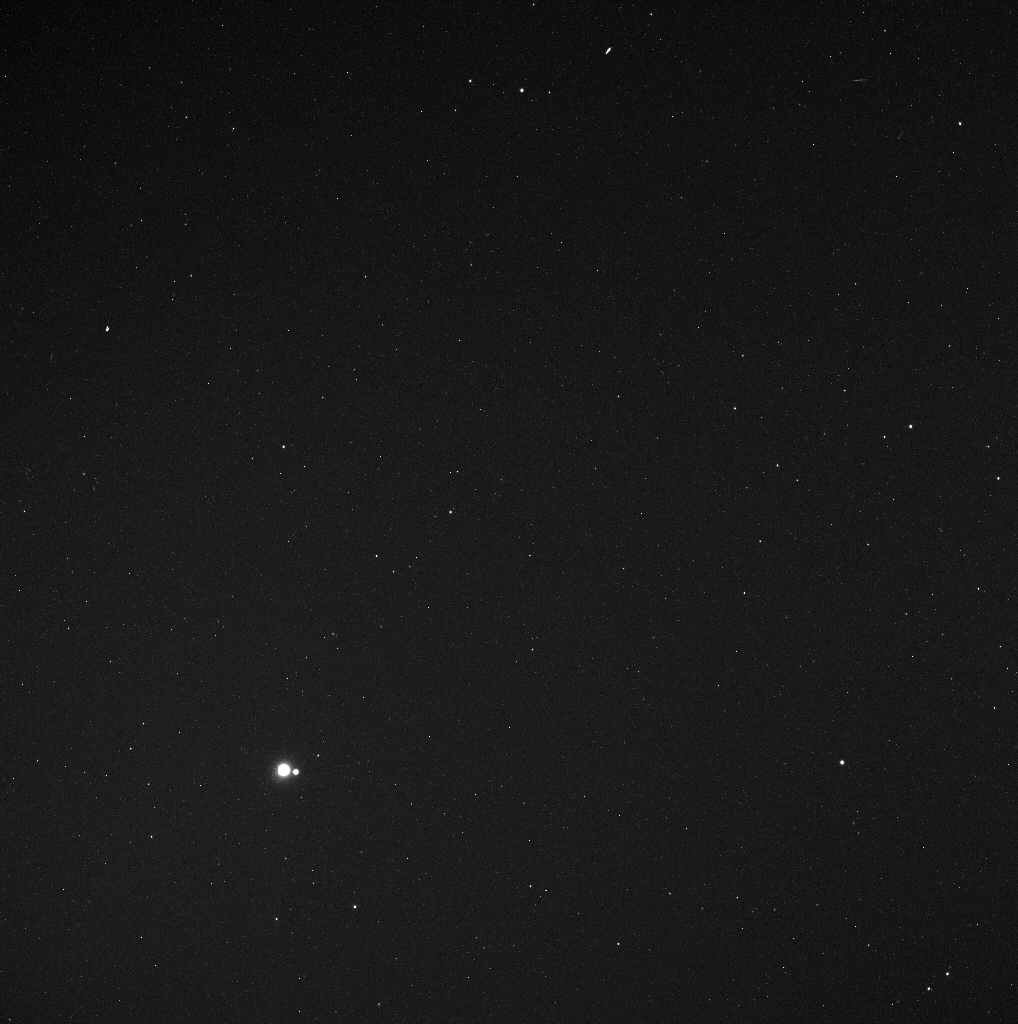
The Earth and Moon (lower left), captured by MESSENGER from a distance of 183 million kilometers.

Earth flyby sequence captured on August 3, 2005 (Full-size video).

=== Two Venus flybys ===
On October 24, 2006, at 08:34 UTC, MESSENGER encountered Venus at an altitude of 2,992 kilometers (1,859 mi). During the encounter, MESSENGER passed behind Venus and entered superior conjunction, a period when Earth was on the exact opposite side of the Solar System, with the Sun inhibiting radio contact. For this reason, no scientific observations were conducted during the flyby. Communication with the spacecraft was reestablished in late November and performed a deep space maneuver on December 12, 2006, to correct the trajectory to encounter Venus in a second flyby.

On June 5, 2007, at 23:08 UTC, MESSENGER performed a second flyby of Venus at an altitude of 338 km (210 mi), for the greatest velocity reduction of the mission. During the encounter, all instruments were used to observe Venus and prepare for the following Mercury encounters. The encounter provided visible and near-infrared imaging data of the upper atmosphere of Venus. Ultraviolet and X-ray spectrometry of the upper atmosphere were also recorded, to characterize the composition. The ESA's Venus Express was also orbiting during the encounter, providing the first opportunity for simultaneous measurement of particle-and-field characteristics of the planet.

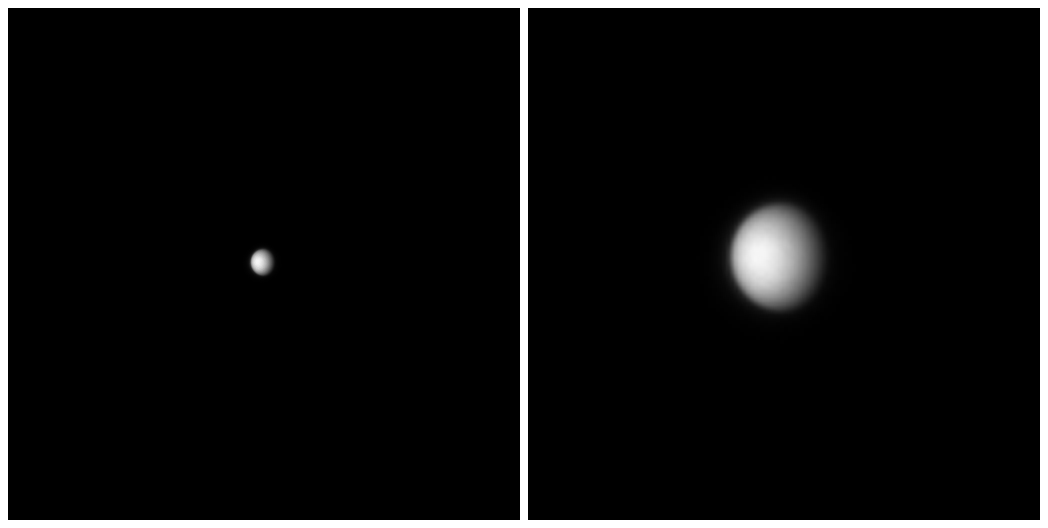
Venus imaged by MESSENGER on its first flyby of the planet in 2006.

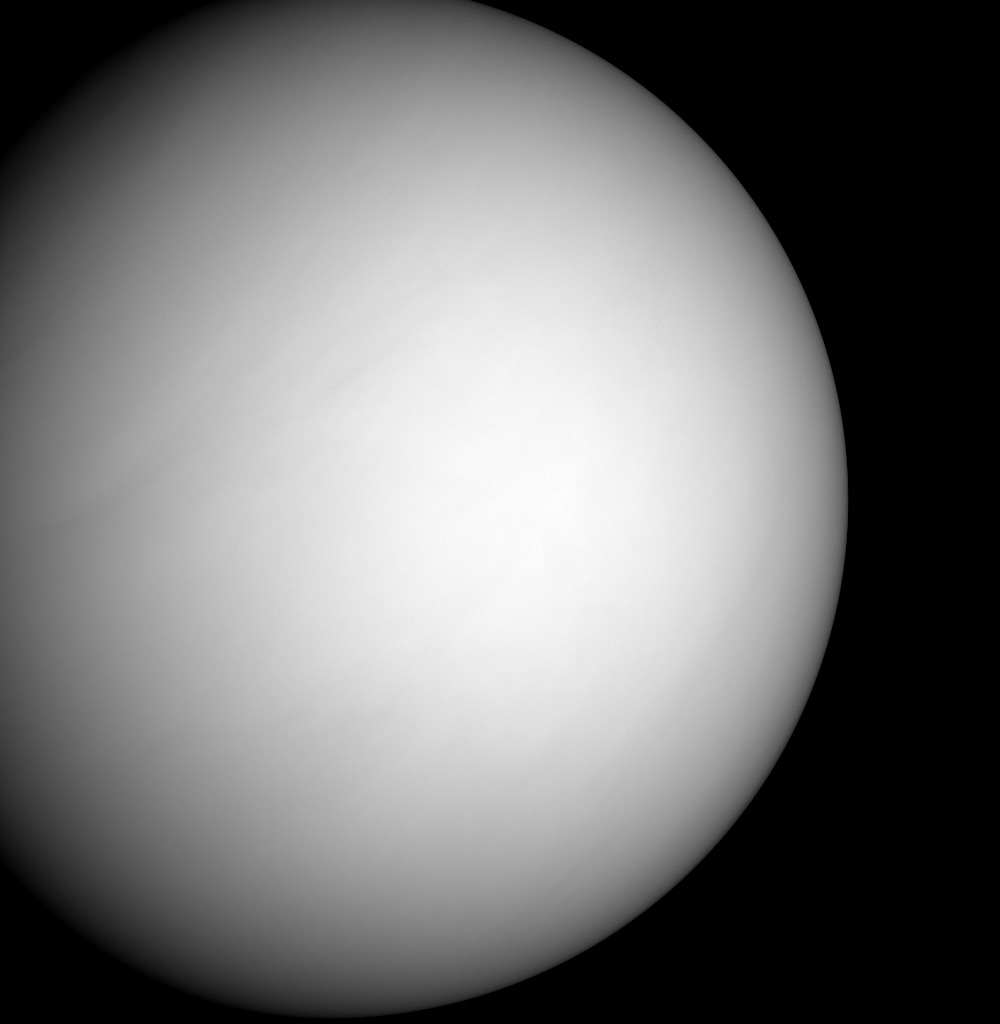
Venus imaged by MESSENGER on its second flyby of the planet in 2007.

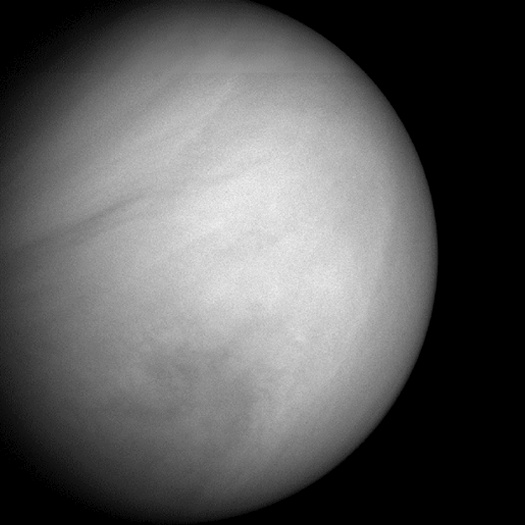
A more detailed image of Venus MESSENGER on the second flyby of the planet.

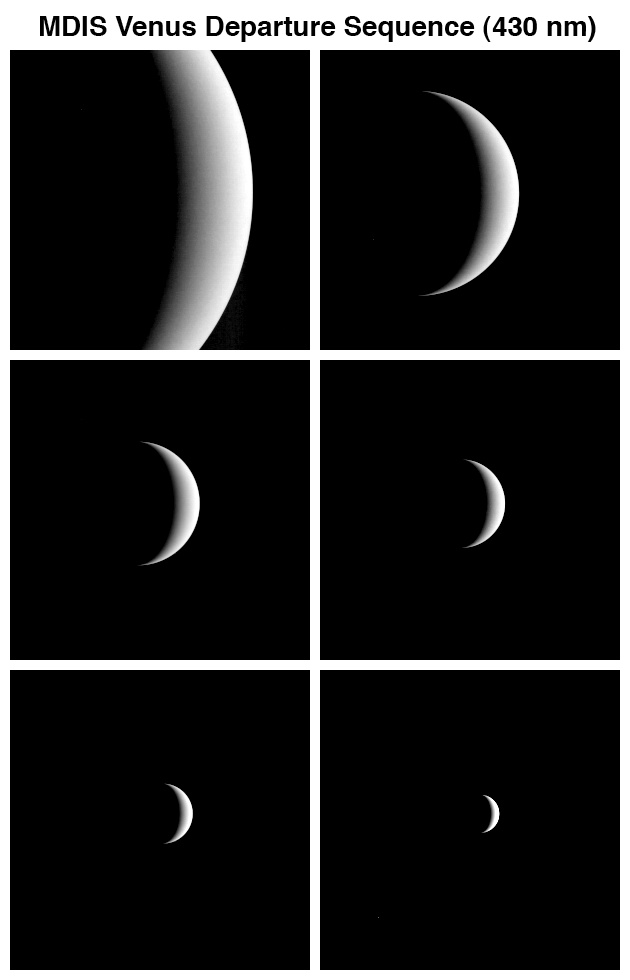
Sequence of images as MESSENGER departs after the second flyby of the planet.

=== Three Mercury flybys ===
MESSENGER made a flyby of Mercury on January 14, 2008 (making its closest approach of 200 km above the surface of Mercury at 19:04:39 UTC), followed by a second flyby on October 6, 2008. MESSENGER executed a final flyby on September 29, 2009, further slowing down the spacecraft. Sometime during the closest approach of the last flyby, the spacecraft entered safe mode. Although this had no effect on the trajectory necessary for later orbit insertion, it resulted in the loss of science data and images that were planned for the outbound leg of the fly-by. The spacecraft had fully recovered by about seven hours later. One last deep space maneuver, DSM-5, was executed on November 24, 2009, at 22:45 UTC to provide the required 0.177 kilometres per second (0.110 mi/s) velocity change for the scheduled Mercury orbit insertion on March 18, 2011, marking the beginning of the orbital mission.

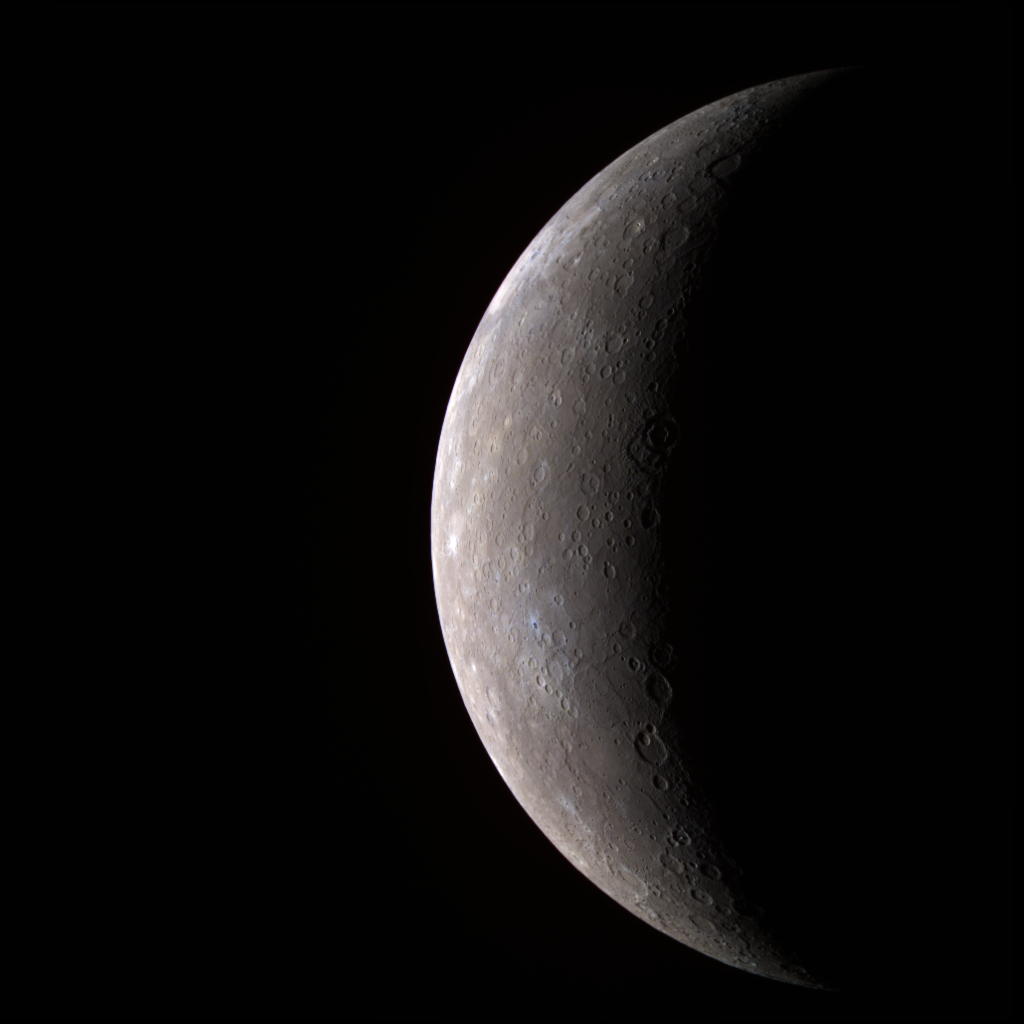
The first high-resolution color Wide Angle Camera image of Mercury acquired by MESSENGER.

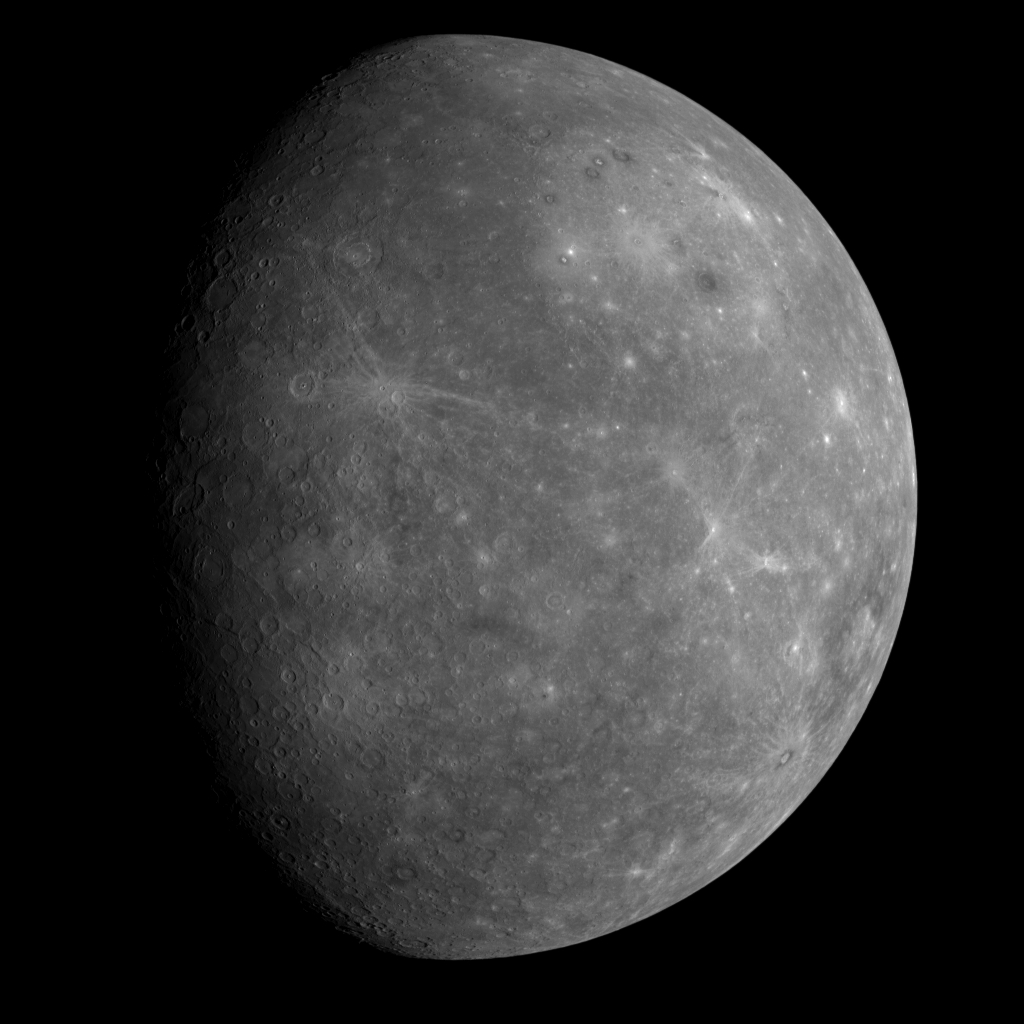
Mercury from later in the first flyby, showing many previously unknown features

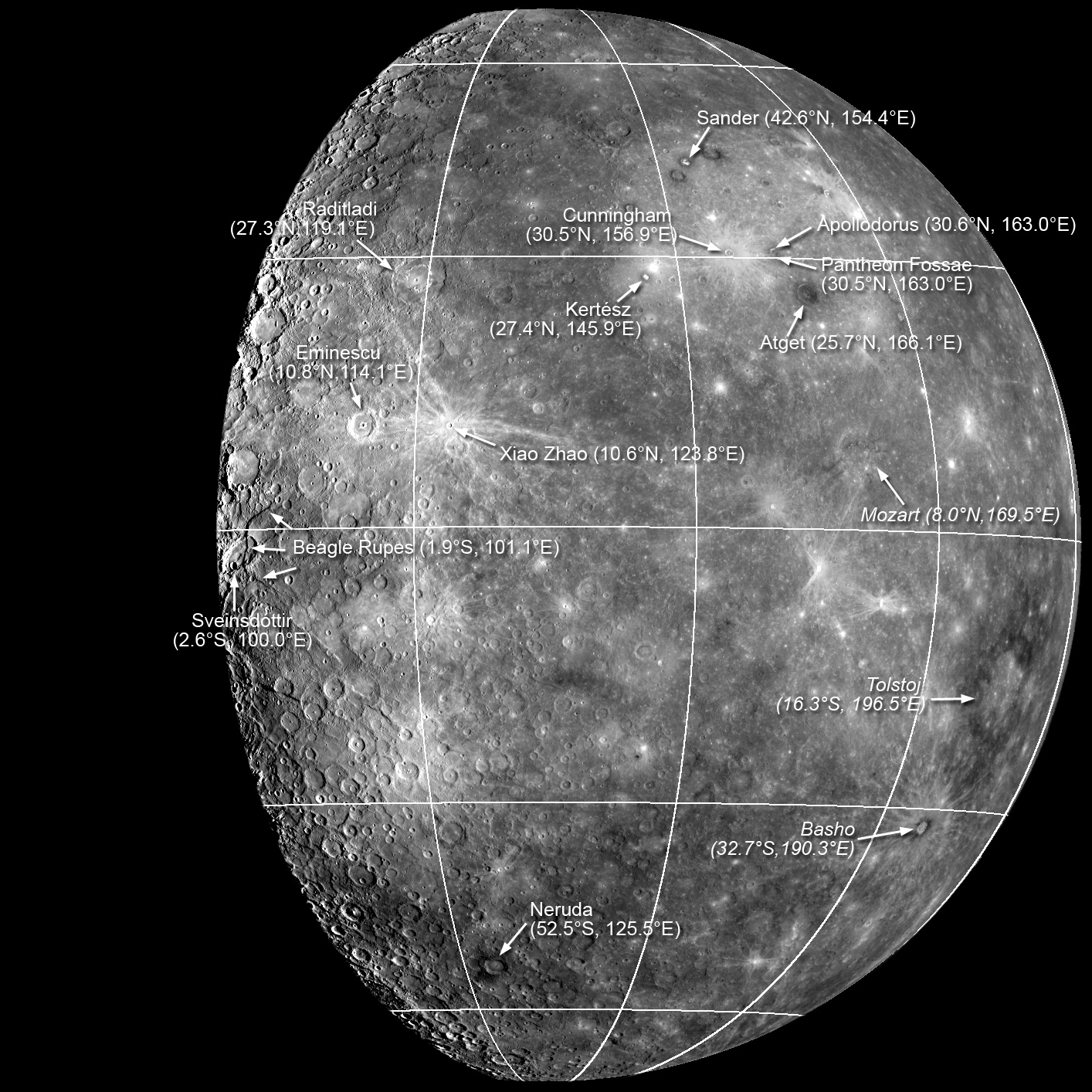
Labeled version of the previous image

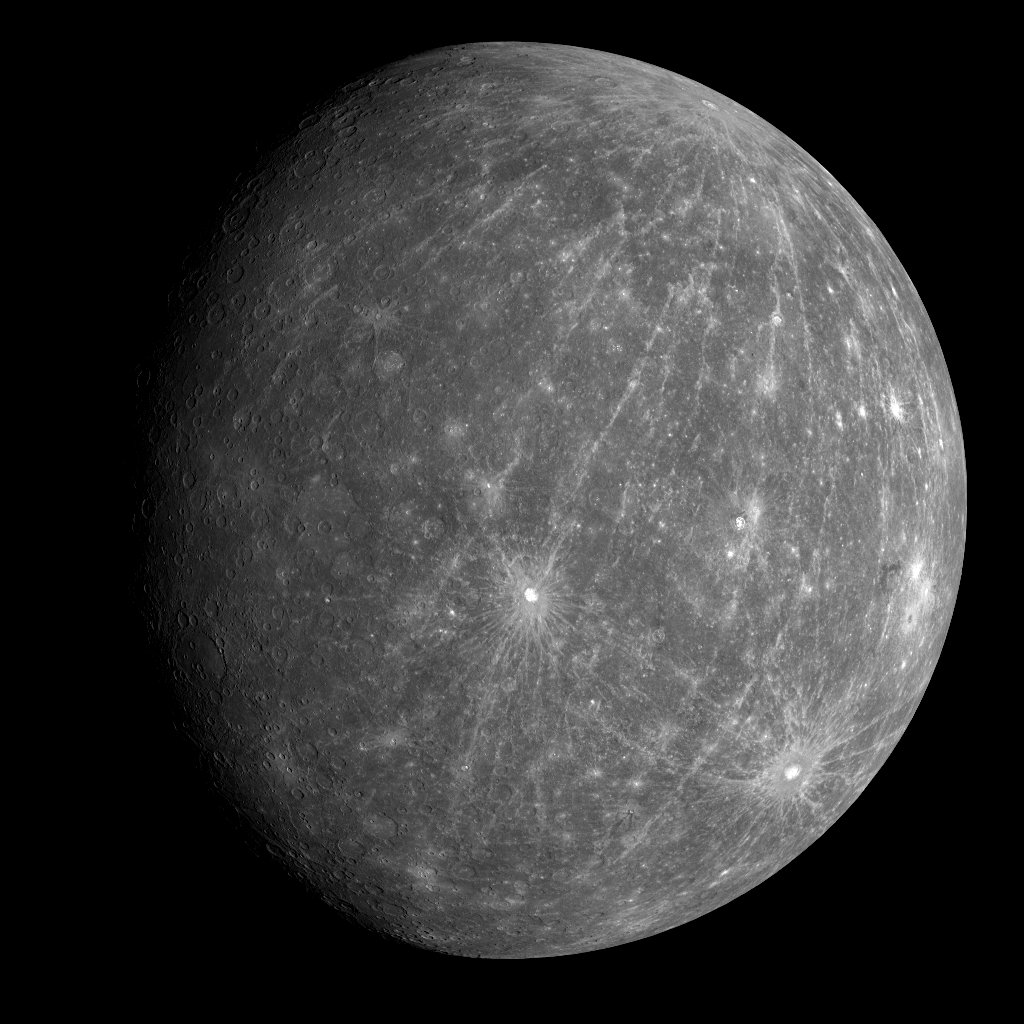
View from the second flyby in October 2008, with Kuiper crater near center

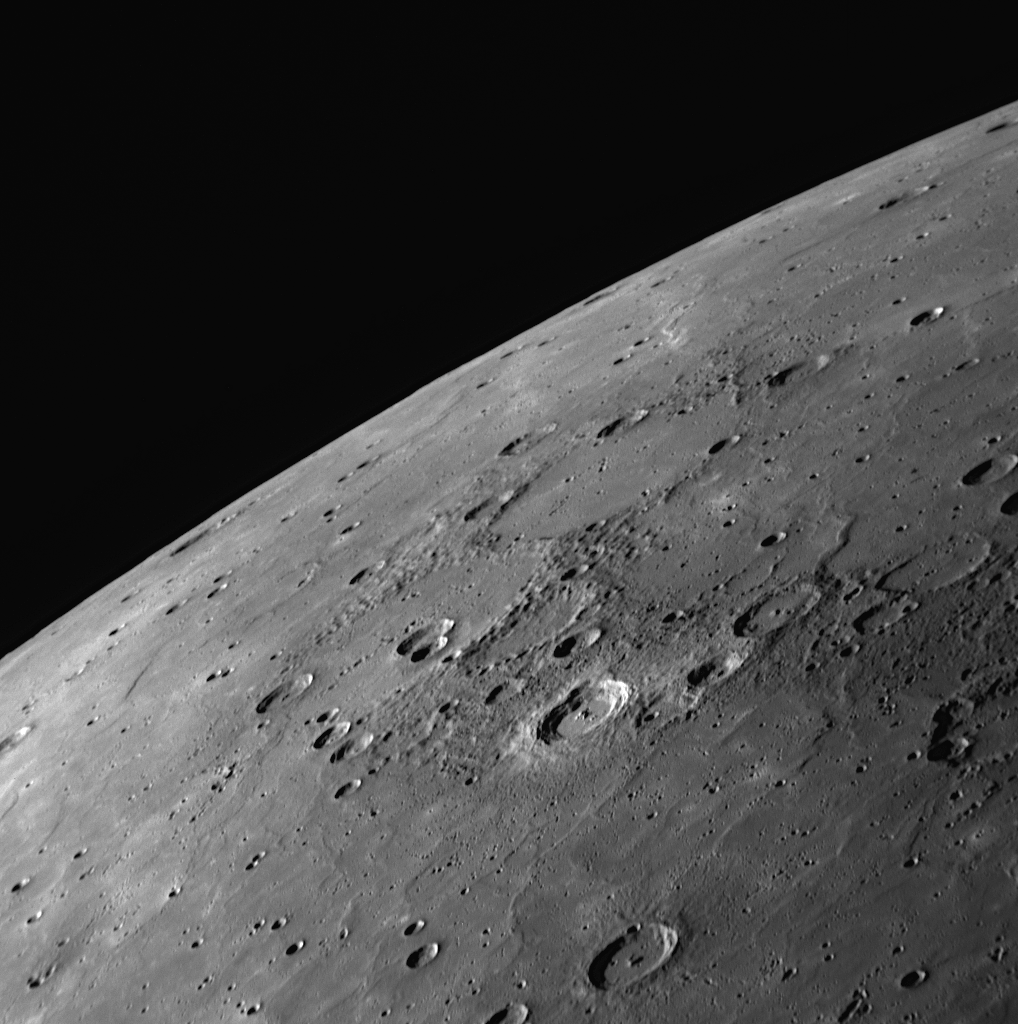
Smooth plains of Borealis Planitia imaged by MESSENGER during the third flyby of the planet.

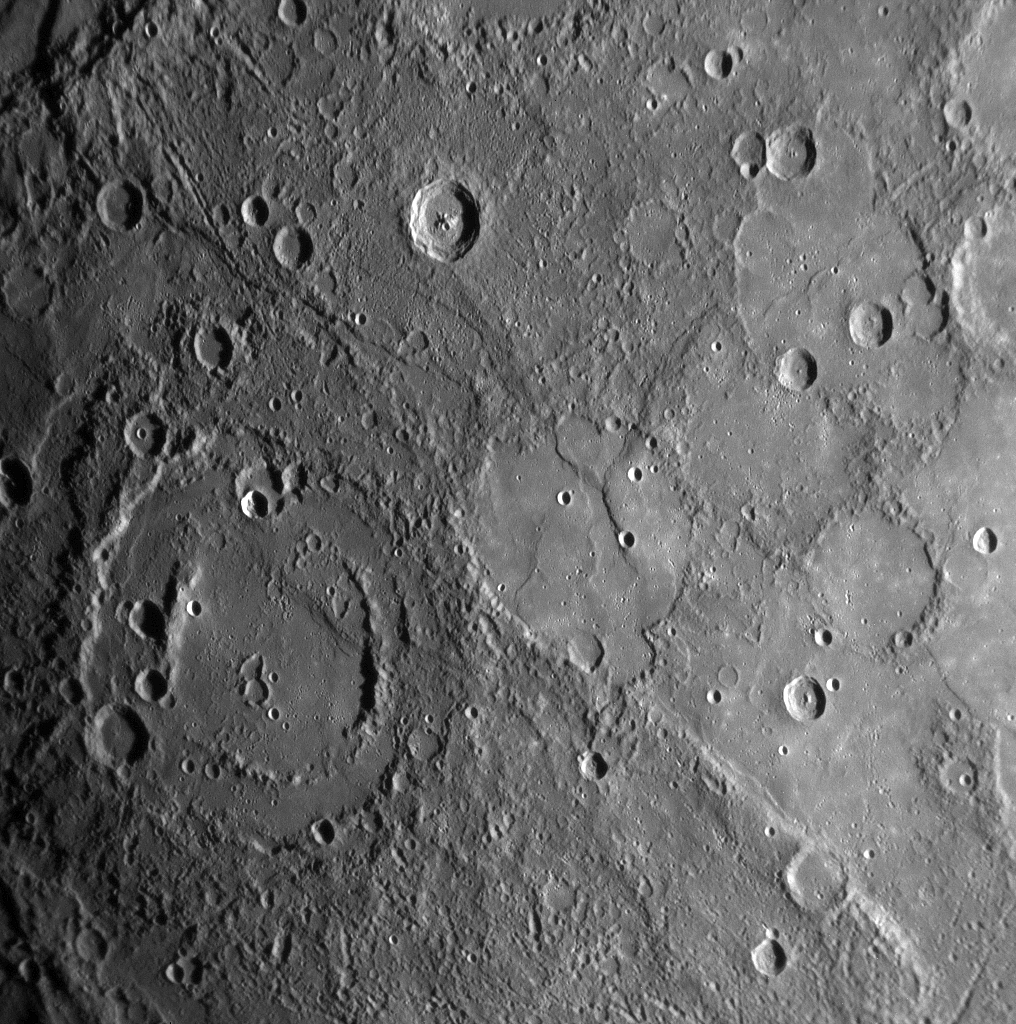
An image of part of the previously unseen side of the planet, including what is now called Manley crater.

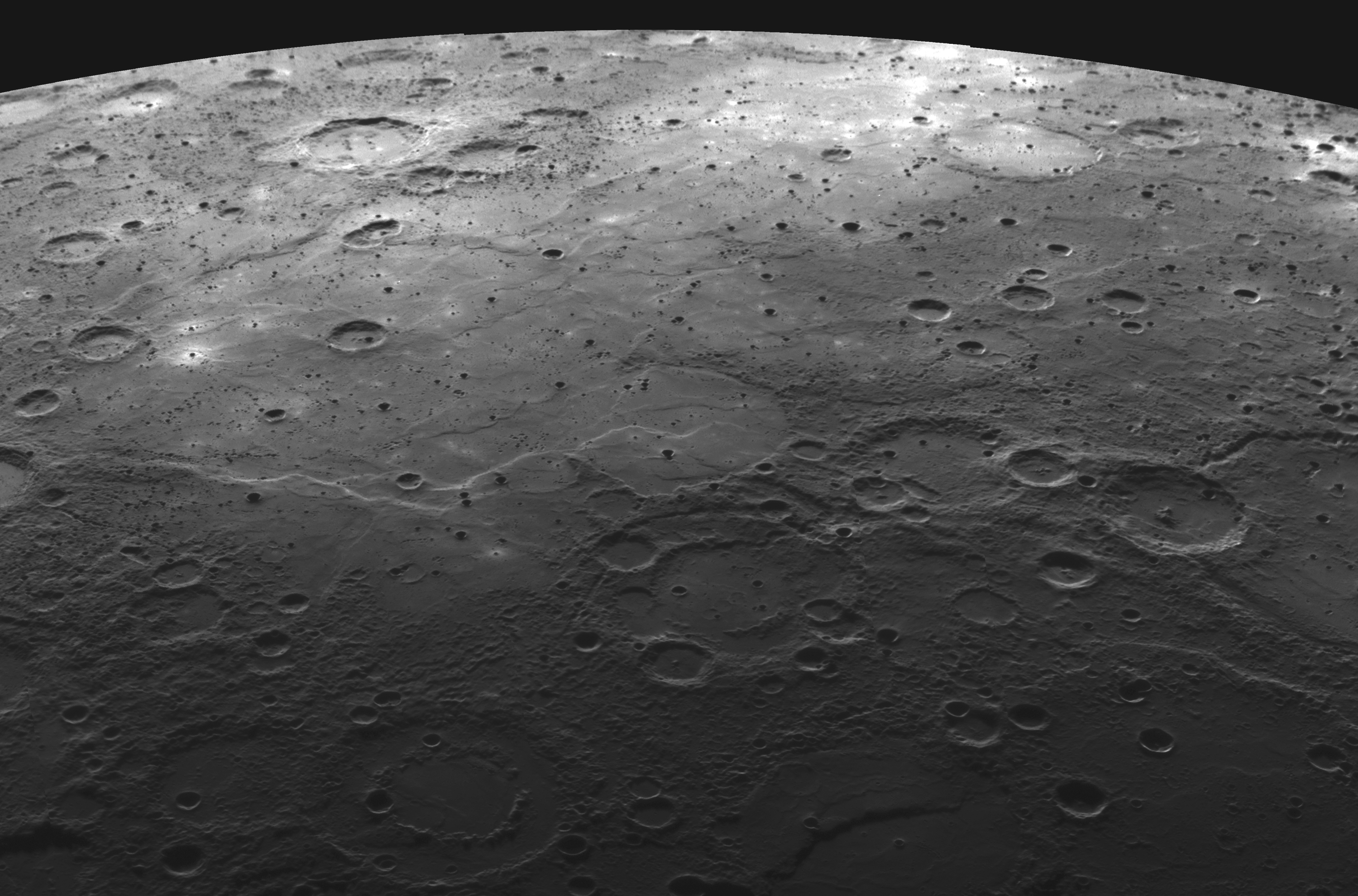
Lava-flooded craters and large expanses of smooth volcanic plains on Mercury.

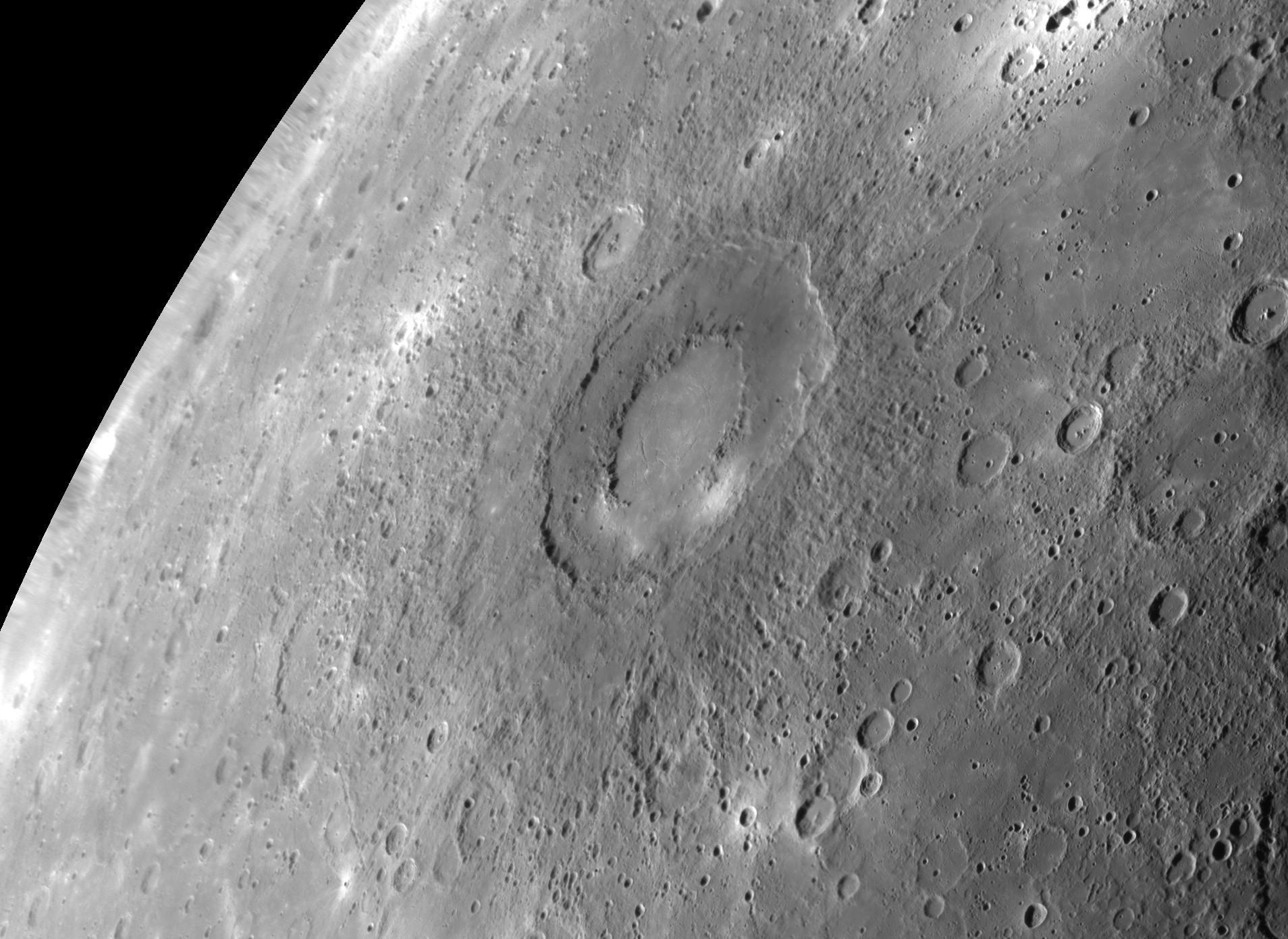
View with Rachmaninoff crater, from third flyby

=== Orbital insertion ===
The thruster maneuver to insert the probe into Mercury's orbit began at 00:45 UTC on March 18, 2011. The 0.9 km/s (0.5 mi./sec.) braking maneuver lasted about 15 minutes, with confirmation that the craft was in Mercury orbit received at 01:10 UTC on March 18 (9:10 PM, March 17 EDT). Mission lead engineer Eric Finnegan indicated that the spacecraft had achieved a near-perfect orbit.

MESSENGER's orbit was highly elliptical, taking it within 200 kilometers (120 miles) of Mercury's surface and then 15,000 km (9,300 miles) away from it every twelve hours. This orbit was chosen to shield the probe from the heat radiated by Mercury's hot surface. Only a small portion of each orbit was at a low altitude, where the spacecraft was subjected to radiative heating from the hot side of the planet.

Animation of MESSENGER's trajectory around Mercury
MESSENGER · Mercury

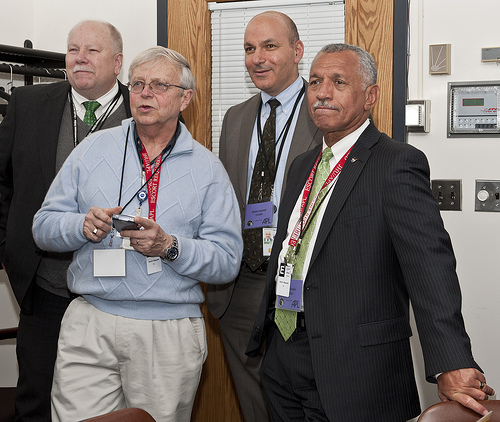
Charles Bolden and colleagues wait for news from the MESSENGER probe.

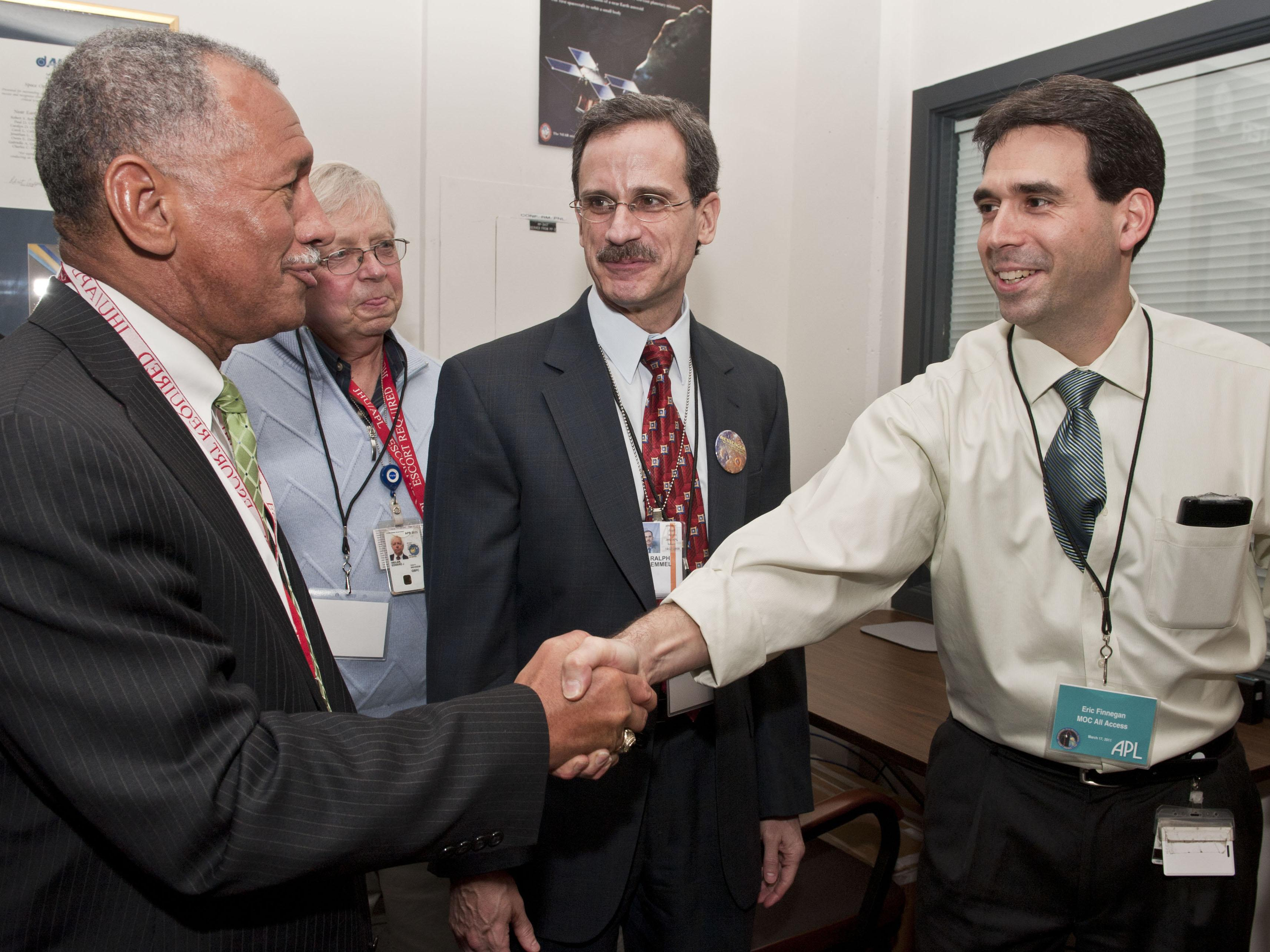
Charles Bolden congratulates Eric Finnegan following the successful orbital insertion.

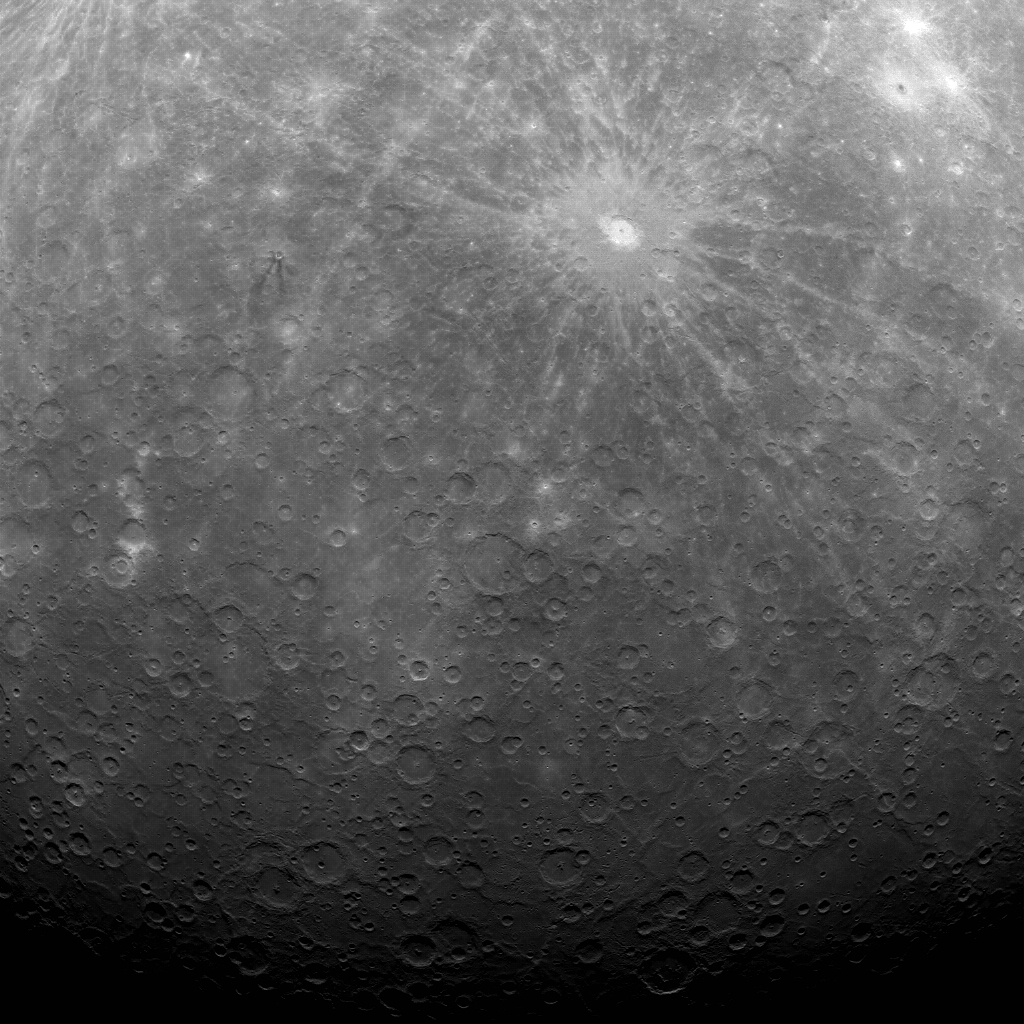
The first-ever photograph from Mercury orbit, taken by MESSENGER on March 29, 2011.

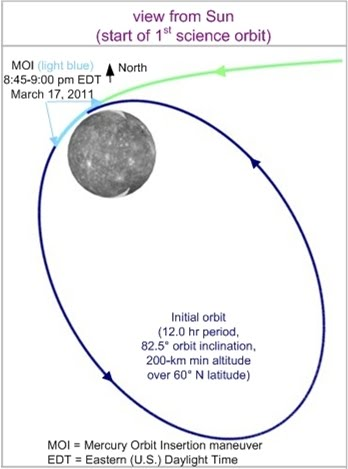
A simplified chart showing the path of MESSENGER's orbital insertion.

== Primary science ==
After MESSENGER's orbital insertion, an eighteen-day commissioning phase took place. The supervising personnel switched on and tested the craft's science instruments to ensure they had completed the journey without damage. The commissioning phase "demonstrated that the spacecraft and payload [were] all operating nominally, notwithstanding Mercury's challenging environment."

The primary mission began as planned on April 4, 2011, with MESSENGER orbiting Mercury once every twelve hours for an intended duration of twelve Earth months, the equivalent of two solar days on Mercury. Principal Investigator Sean Solomon, then of the Carnegie Institution of Washington, said: "With the beginning today of the primary science phase of the mission, we will be making nearly continuous observations that will allow us to gain the first global perspective on the innermost planet. Moreover, as solar activity steadily increases, we will have a front-row seat on the most dynamic magnetosphere–atmosphere system in the Solar System."

On October 5, 2011, the scientific results obtained by MESSENGER during its first six terrestrial months in Mercury's orbit were presented in a series of papers at the European Planetary Science Congress in Nantes, France. Among the discoveries presented were the unexpectedly high concentrations of magnesium and calcium found in the atmosphere of Mercury's nightside, and the fact that Mercury's magnetic field is offset far to the north of the planet's center.

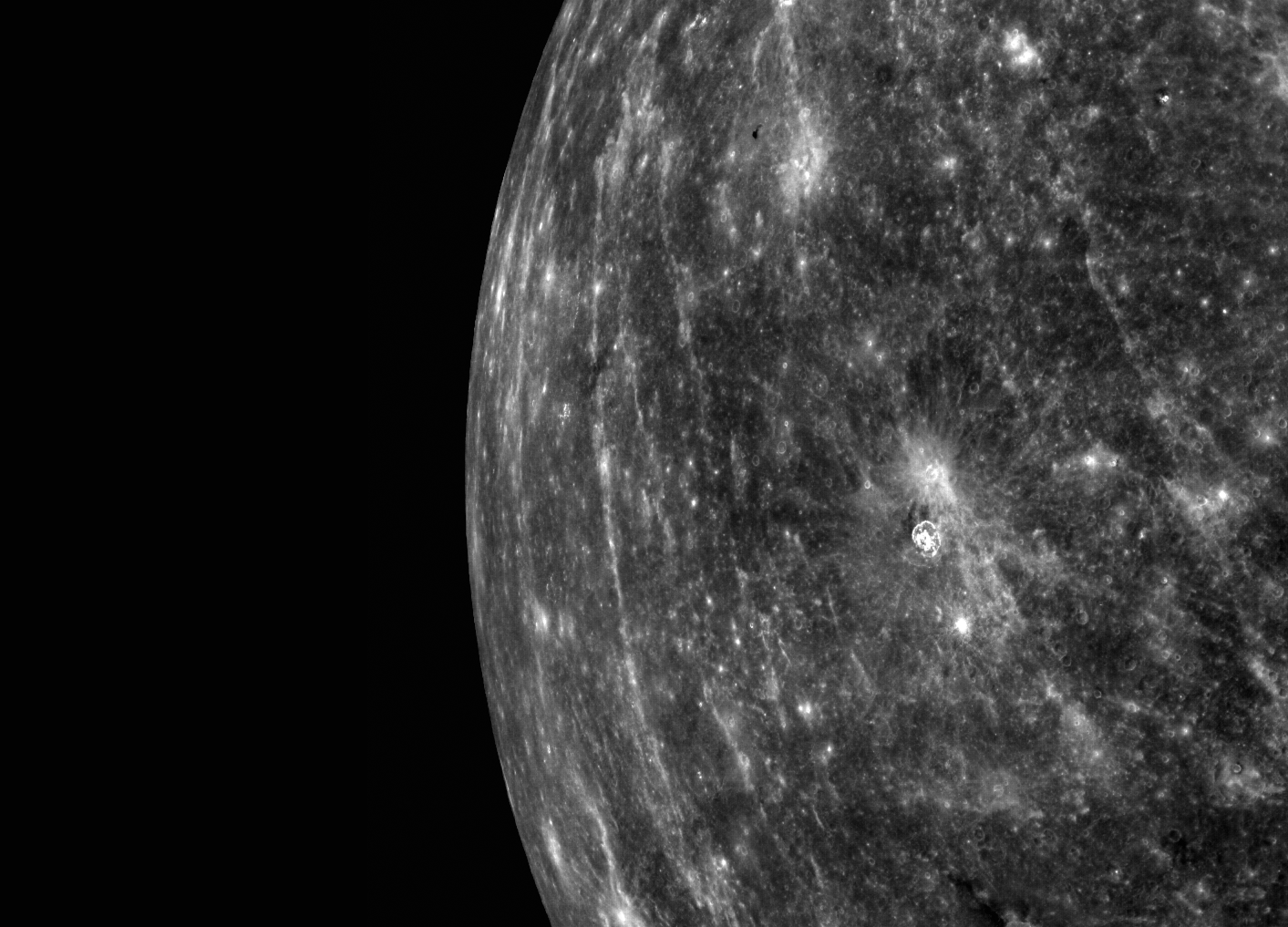
A monochrome image of Mercury from MESSENGER, with Warhol at center.

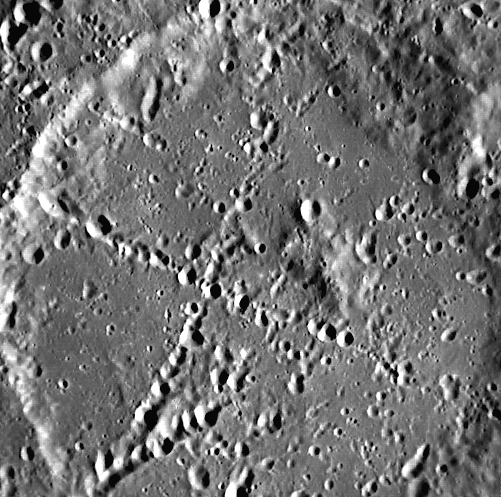
Stevenson crater, with two perpendicular secondary crater chains running through its center.

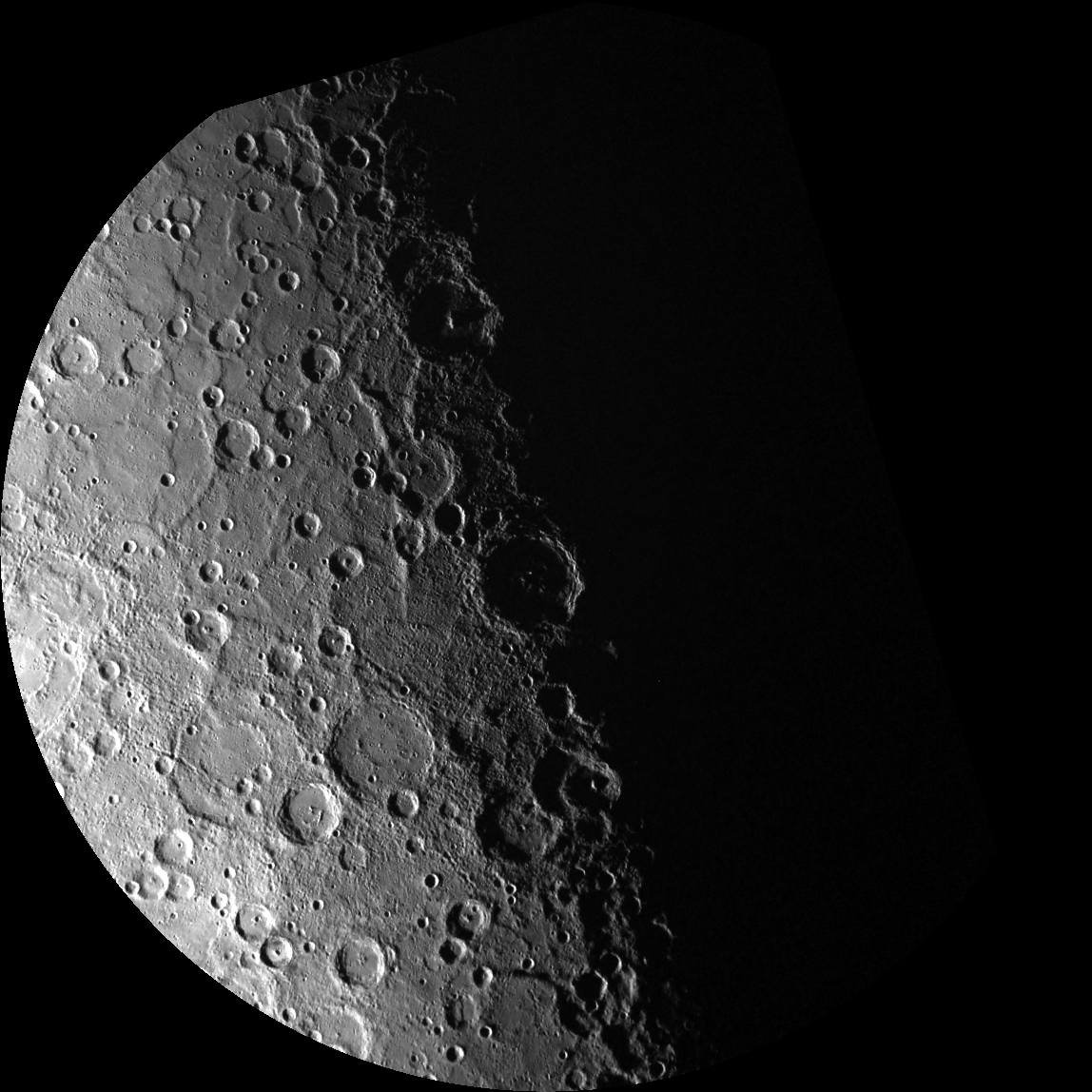
A south polar projection of Mercury.

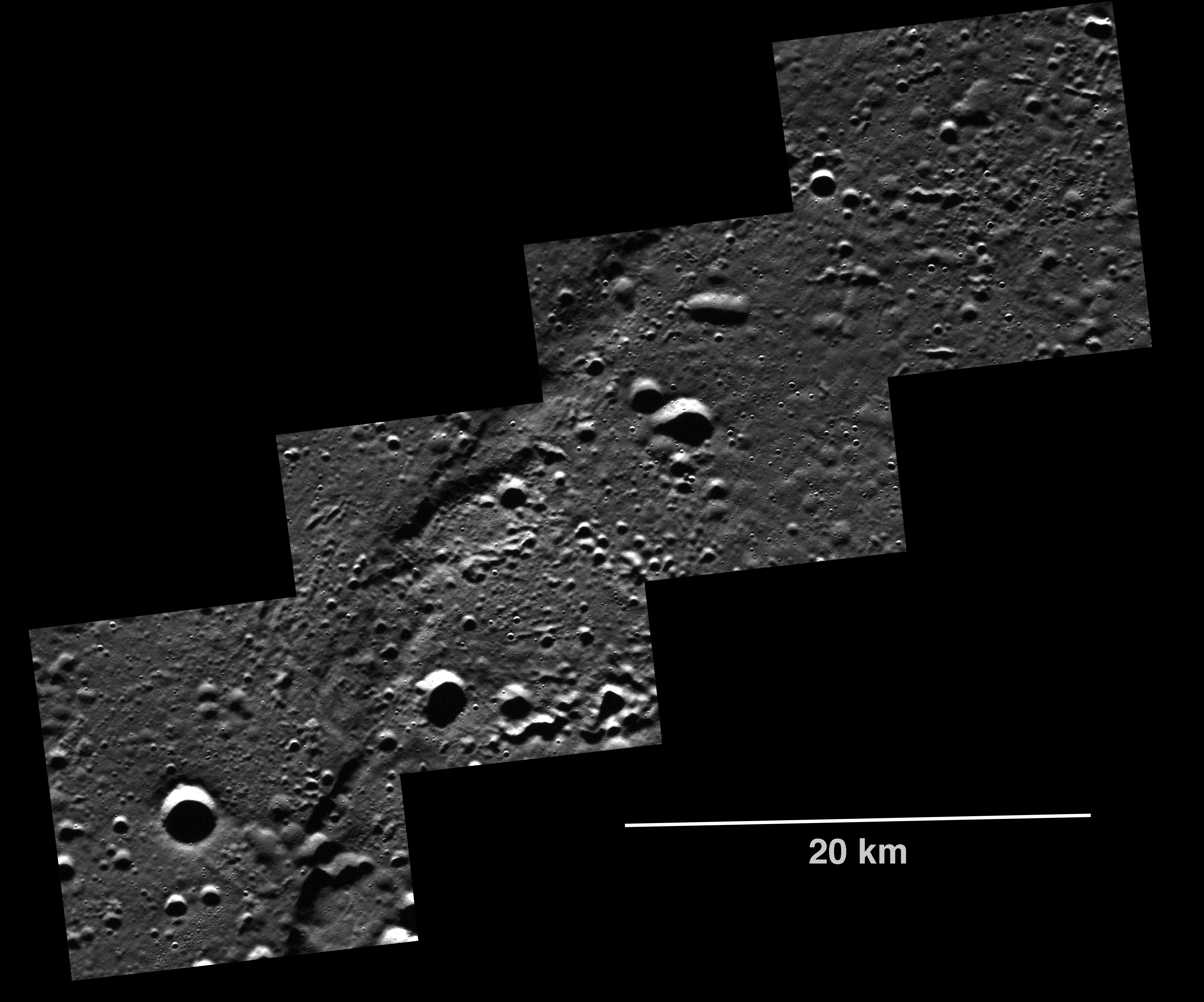
A close snapshot of ridges near Mercury's south pole.

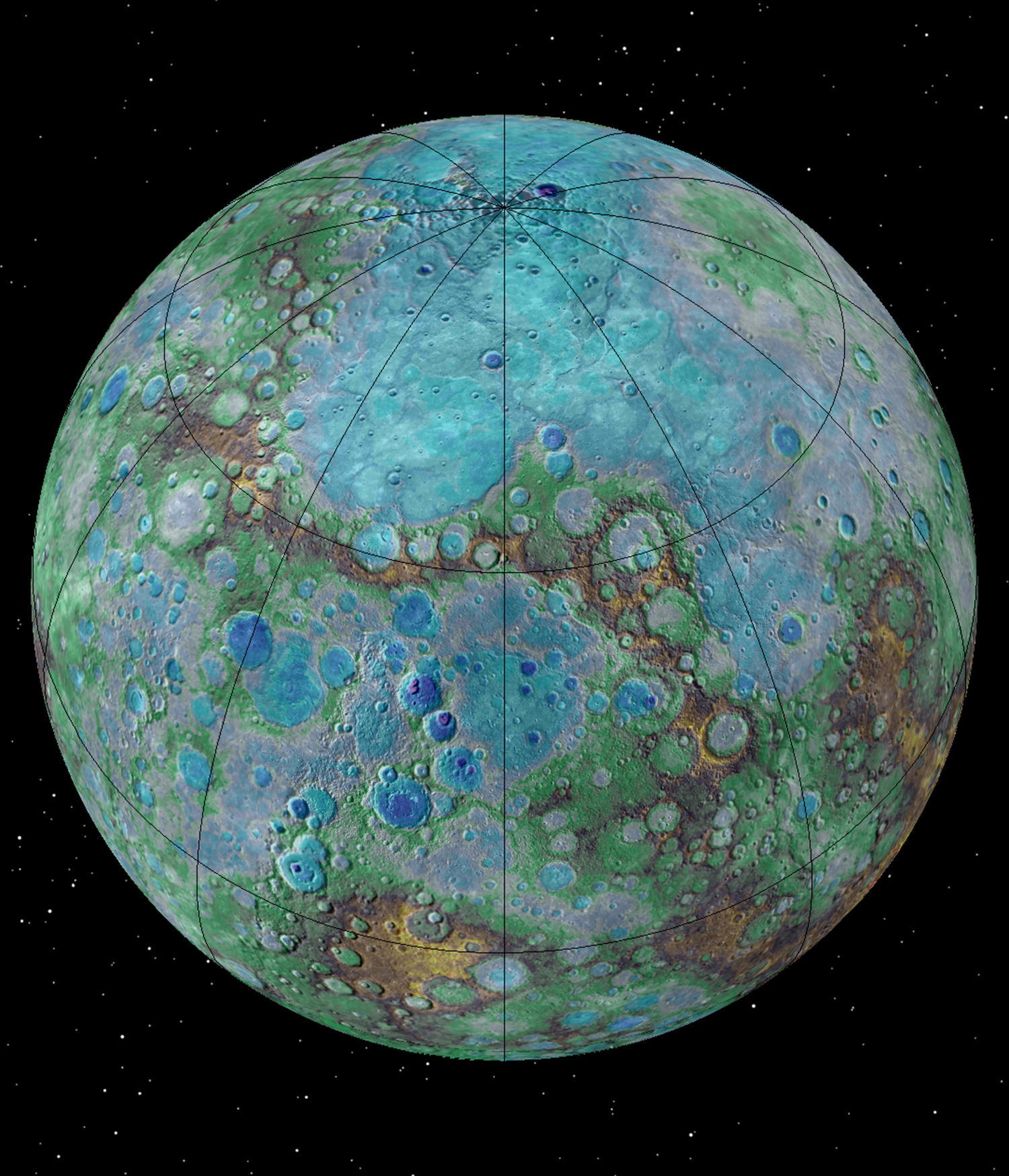
A topographic MESSENGER composite image of Mercury shows previously undetected fault scarps— cliff-like landforms resembling stairs that are small enough that scientists believe they are geologically young. This shows that Mercury is still contracting, and that Earth is not the only tectonically active Solar System planet.

=== Extended mission ===
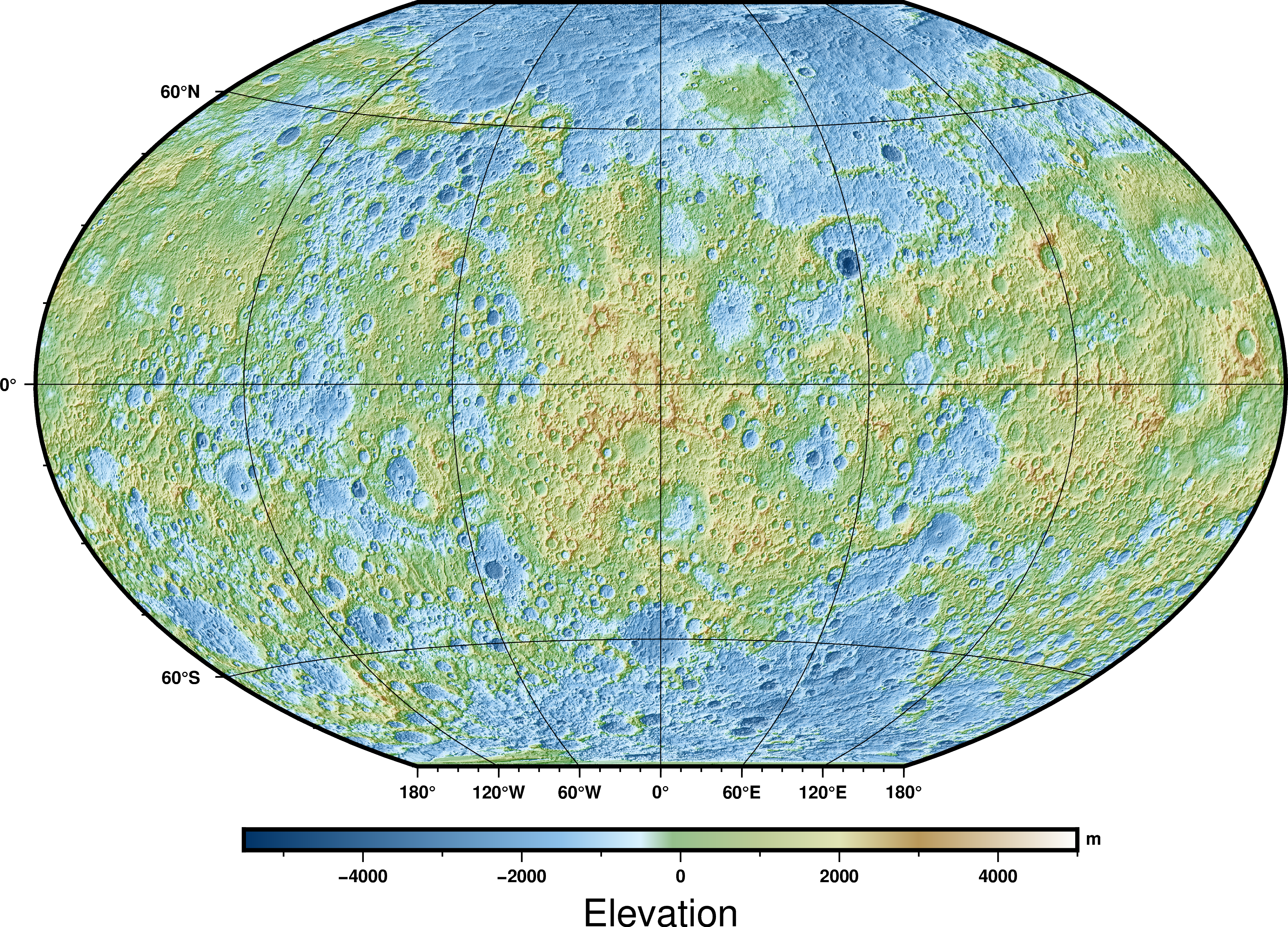
Topography of Mercury based on MDIS (Mercury Dual Imaging System) data

In November 2011, NASA announced that the MESSENGER mission would be extended by one year, allowing the spacecraft to observe the 2012 solar maximum. Its extended mission began on March 17, 2012, and continued until March 17, 2013. Between April 16 and 20, 2012, MESSENGER carried out a series of thruster manoeuvres, placing it in an eight-hour orbit to conduct further scans of Mercury.

In November 2012, NASA reported that MESSENGER had discovered a possibility of both water ice and organic compounds in permanently shadowed craters in Mercury's north pole. In February 2013, NASA published the most detailed and accurate 3D map of Mercury to date, assembled from thousands of images taken by MESSENGER. MESSENGER completed its first extended mission on March 17, 2013, and its second lasted until April 2015. In November 2013, MESSENGER was among the numerous space assets that imaged Comet Encke (2P/Encke) and Comet ISON (C/2012 S1). As its orbit began to decay in early 2015, MESSENGER was able to take highly detailed close-up photographs of ice-filled craters and other landforms at Mercury's north pole. After the mission was completed, review of the radio ranging data provided the first measurement of the rate of mass loss from the Sun.

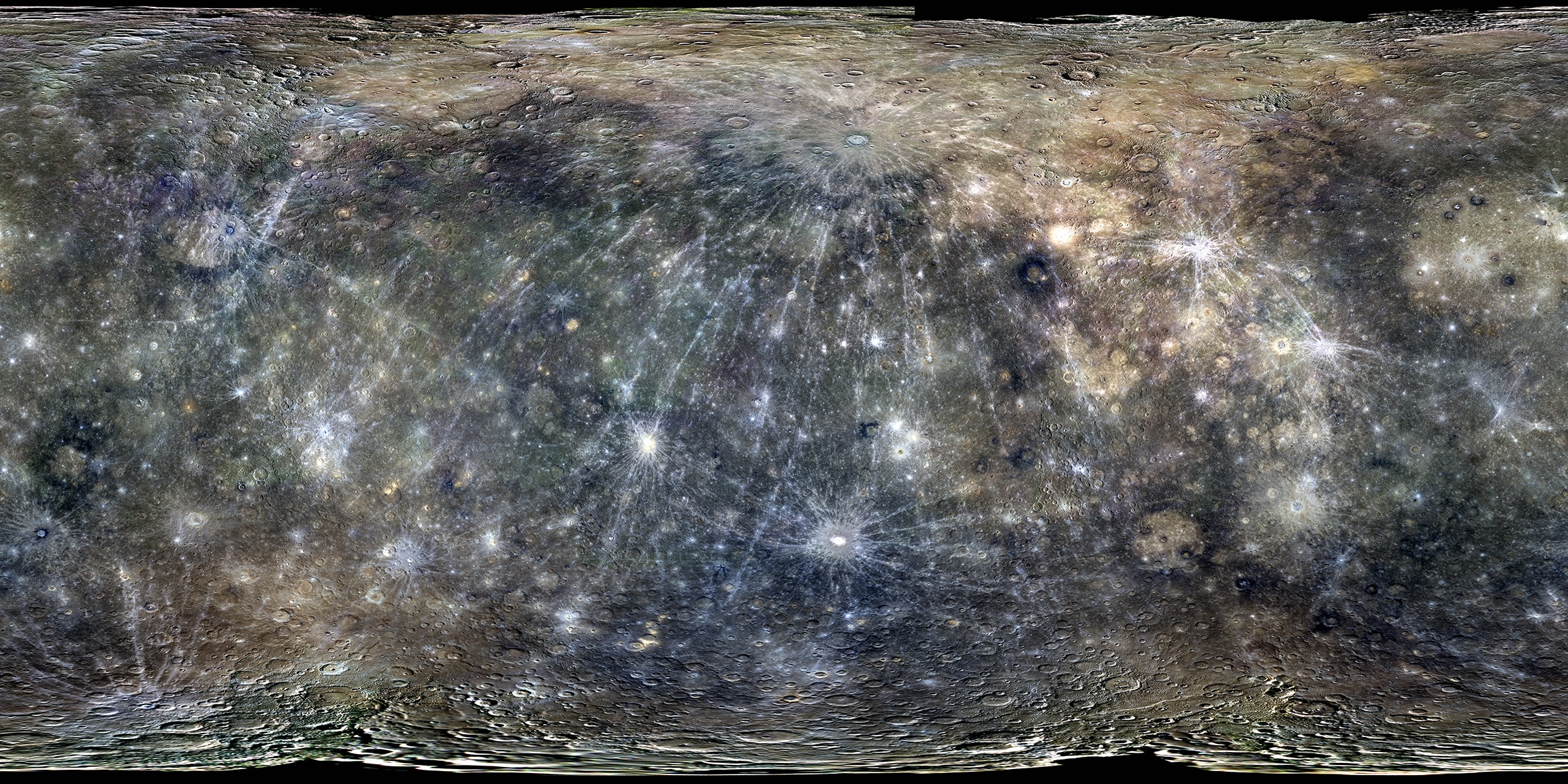
Global exaggerated-color map based on Wide Angle Camera images taken through various filters.

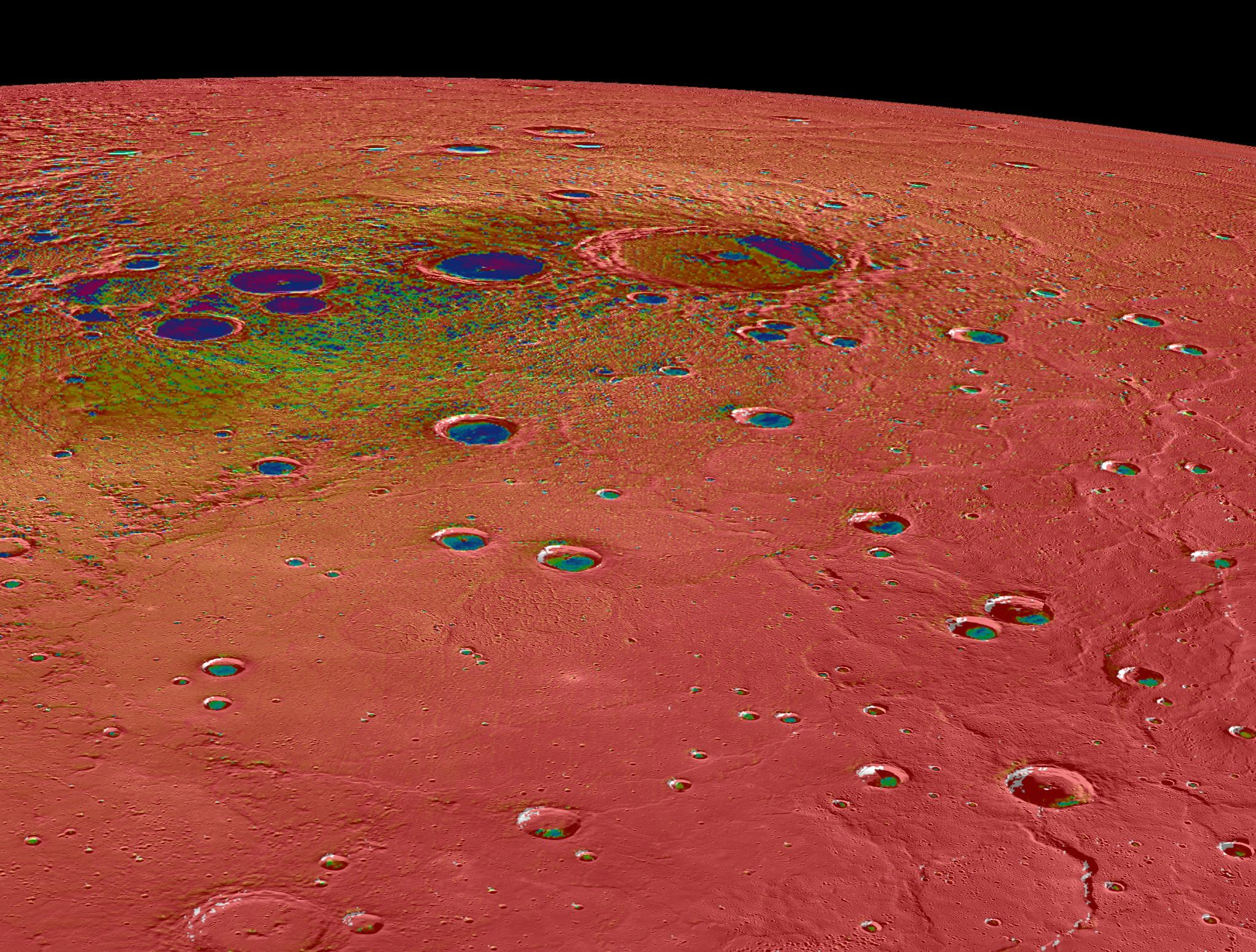
False-color map showing maximum temperatures of north polar region.

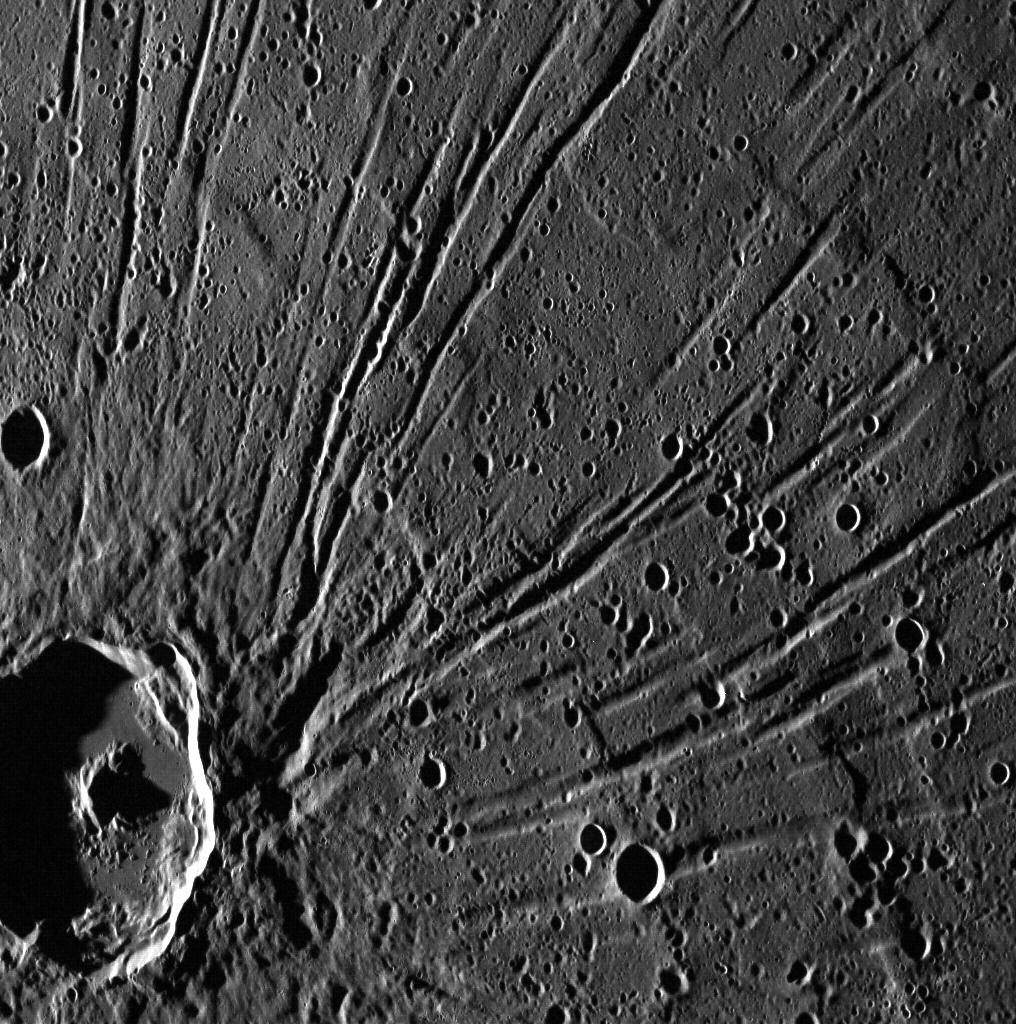
Crater Apollodorus, with the Pantheon Fossae radiating from it.

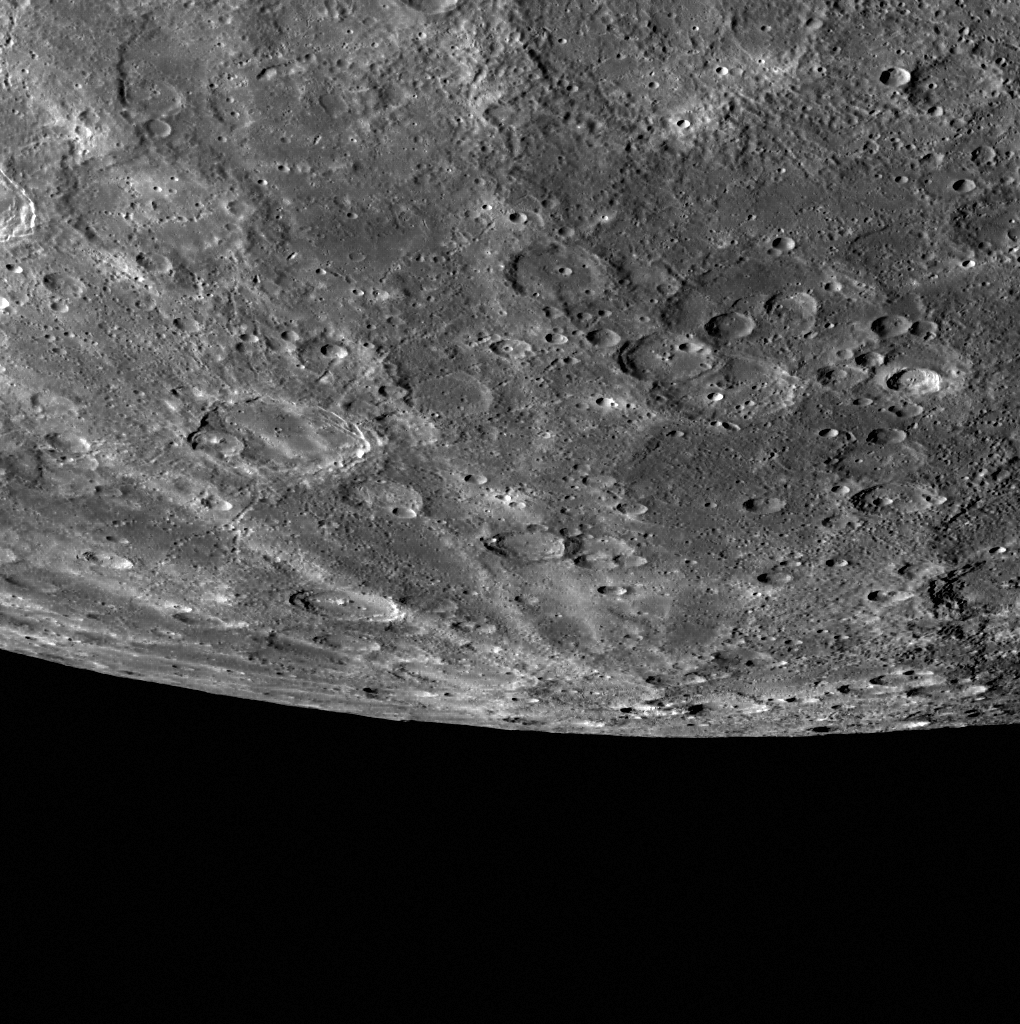
Crater rays streaking across the planet's southern hemisphere.

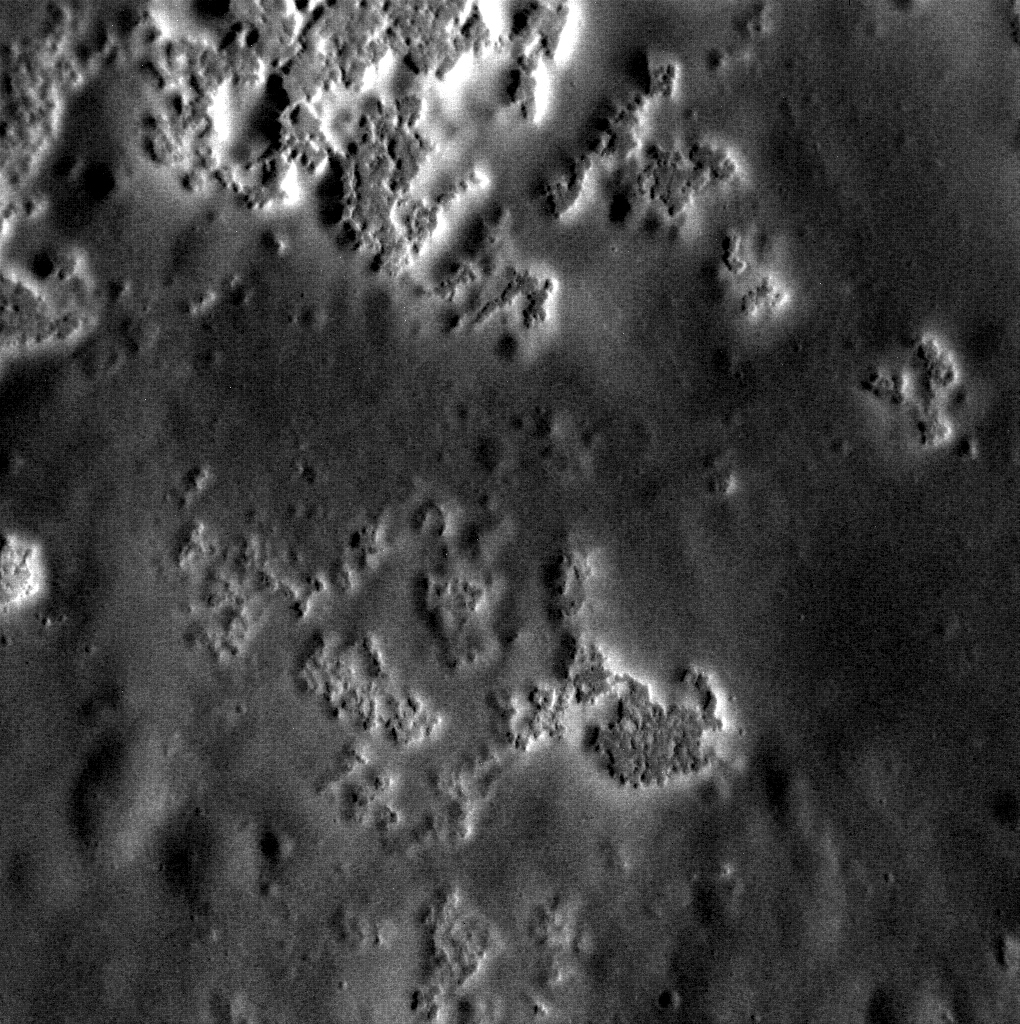
Hollows in the wall of crater Sholem Aleichem.

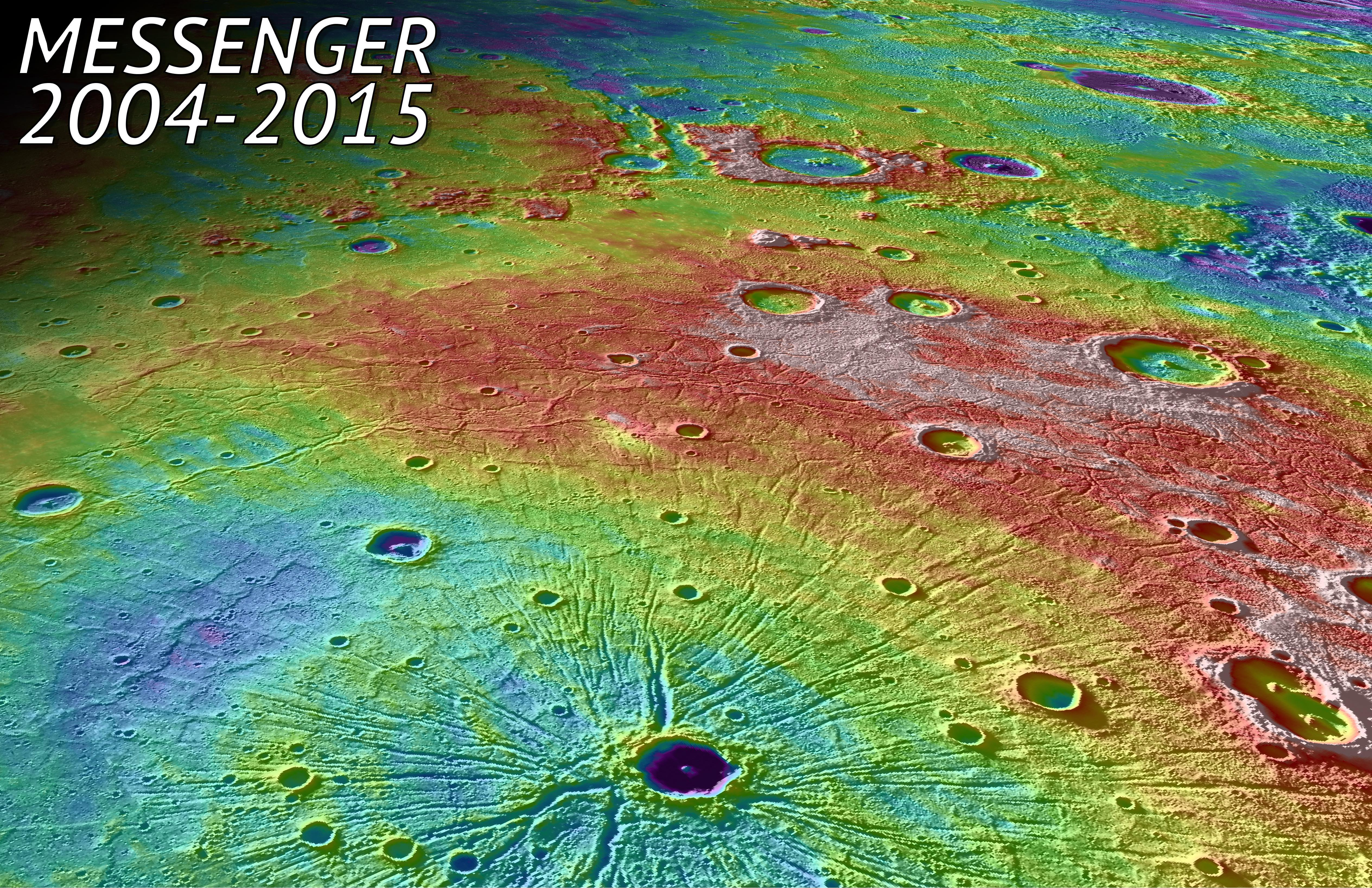
Perspective view of Caloris Basin – high (red); low (blue).

On July 3, 2008, the MESSENGER team announced that the probe had discovered large amounts of water present in Mercury's exosphere, which was an unexpected finding. In the later years of its mission, MESSENGER also provided visual evidence of past volcanic activity on the surface of Mercury, as well as evidence for a liquid iron planetary core. The probe also constructed the most detailed and accurate maps of Mercury to date, and furthermore discovered carbon-containing organic compounds and water ice inside permanently shadowed craters near the north pole.

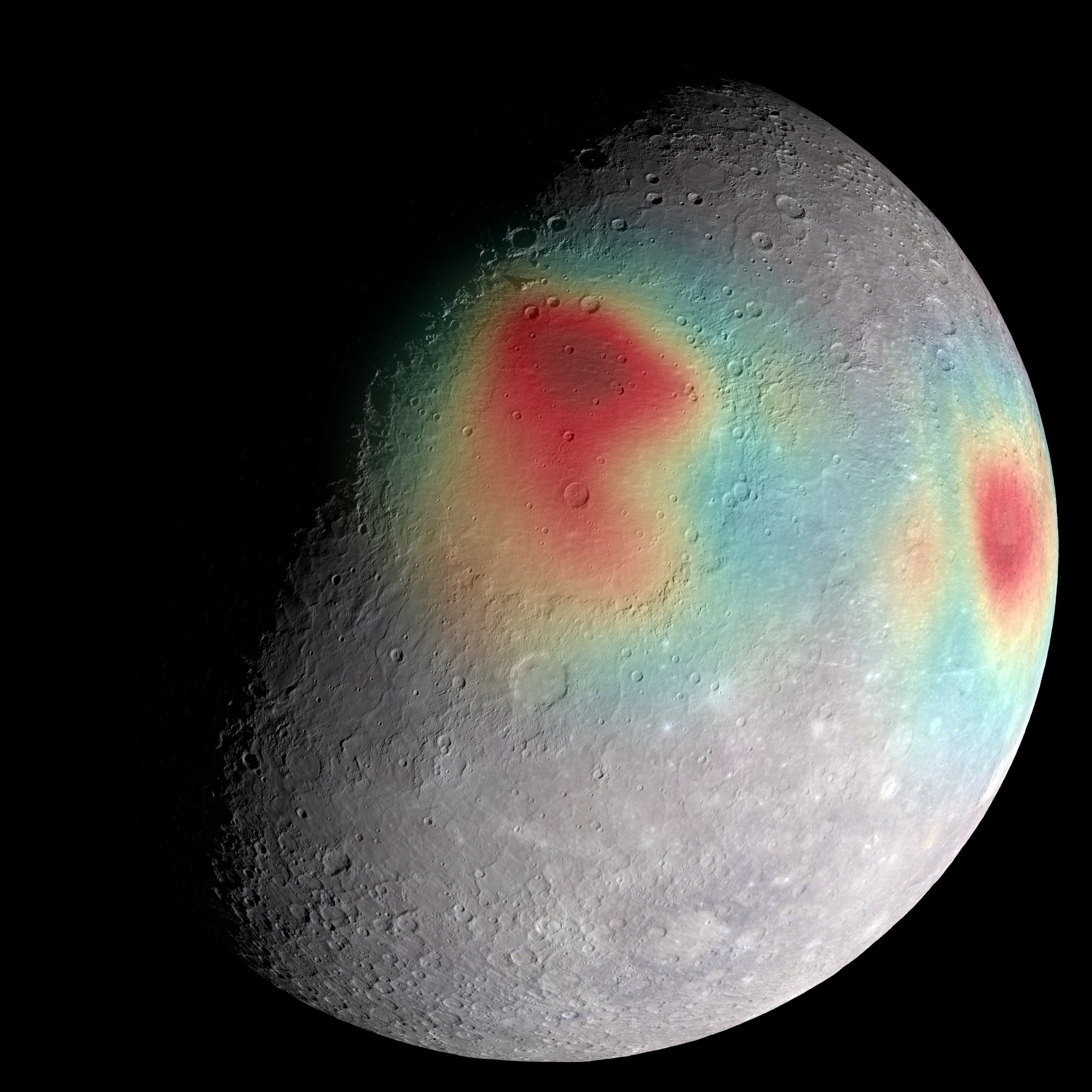
Mass concentrations (red; Caloris Basin at center, Sobkou Planitia at right), detected via gravity anomalies, provide evidence for subsurface structure and evolution.

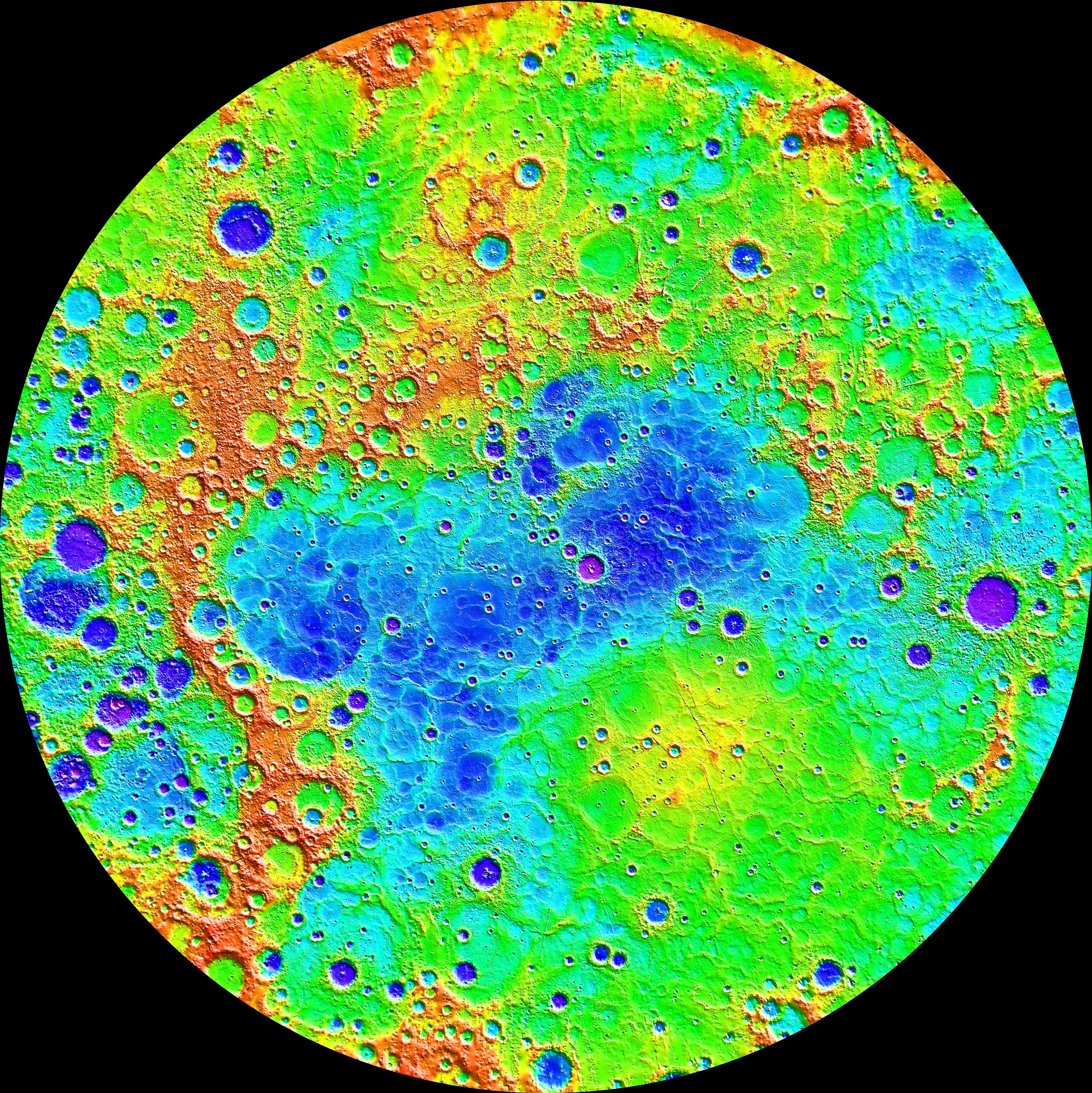
Northern hemisphere topography from MLA data shows a 10 km vertical range: high (red); low (purple).

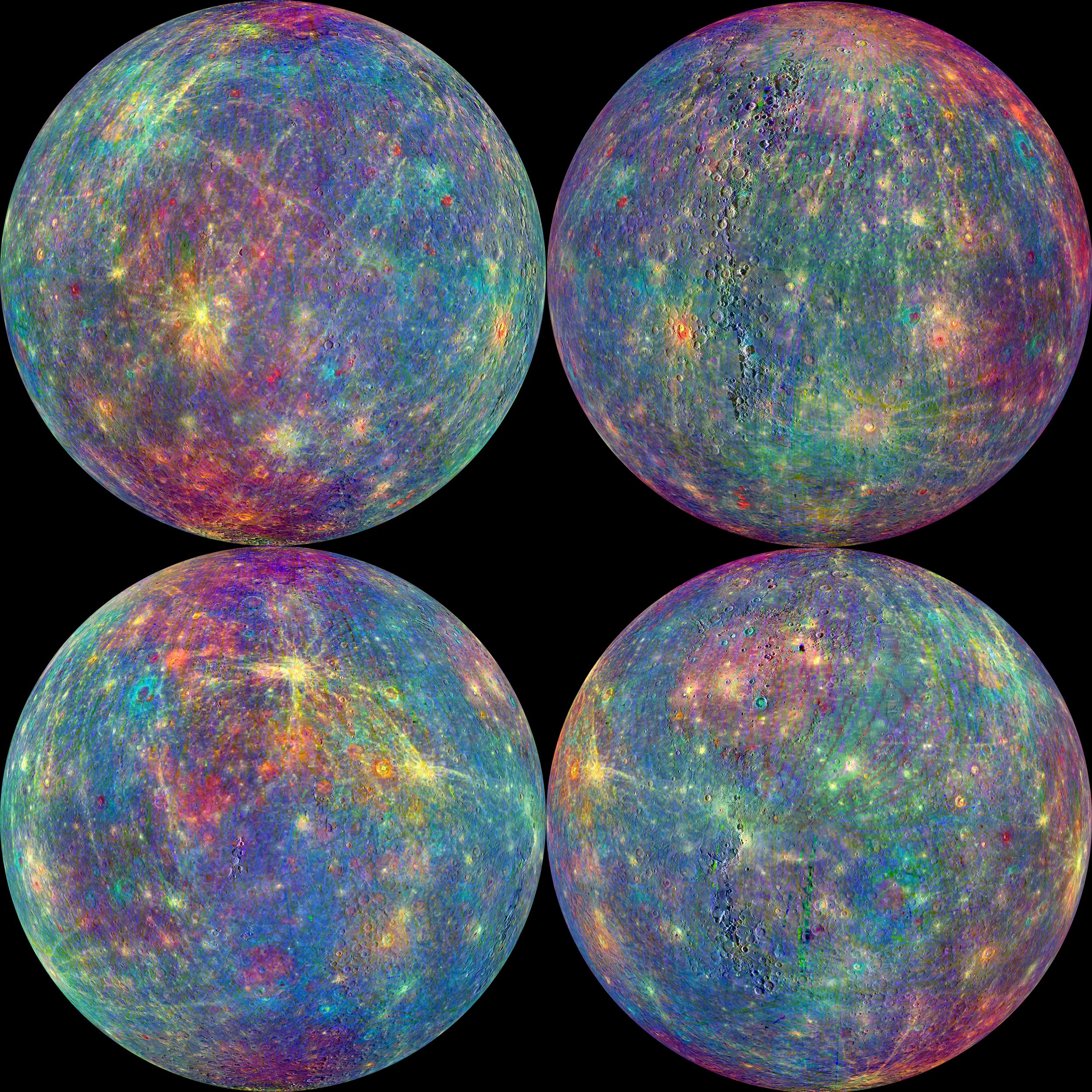
MASCS spectral scan of Mercury's surface.

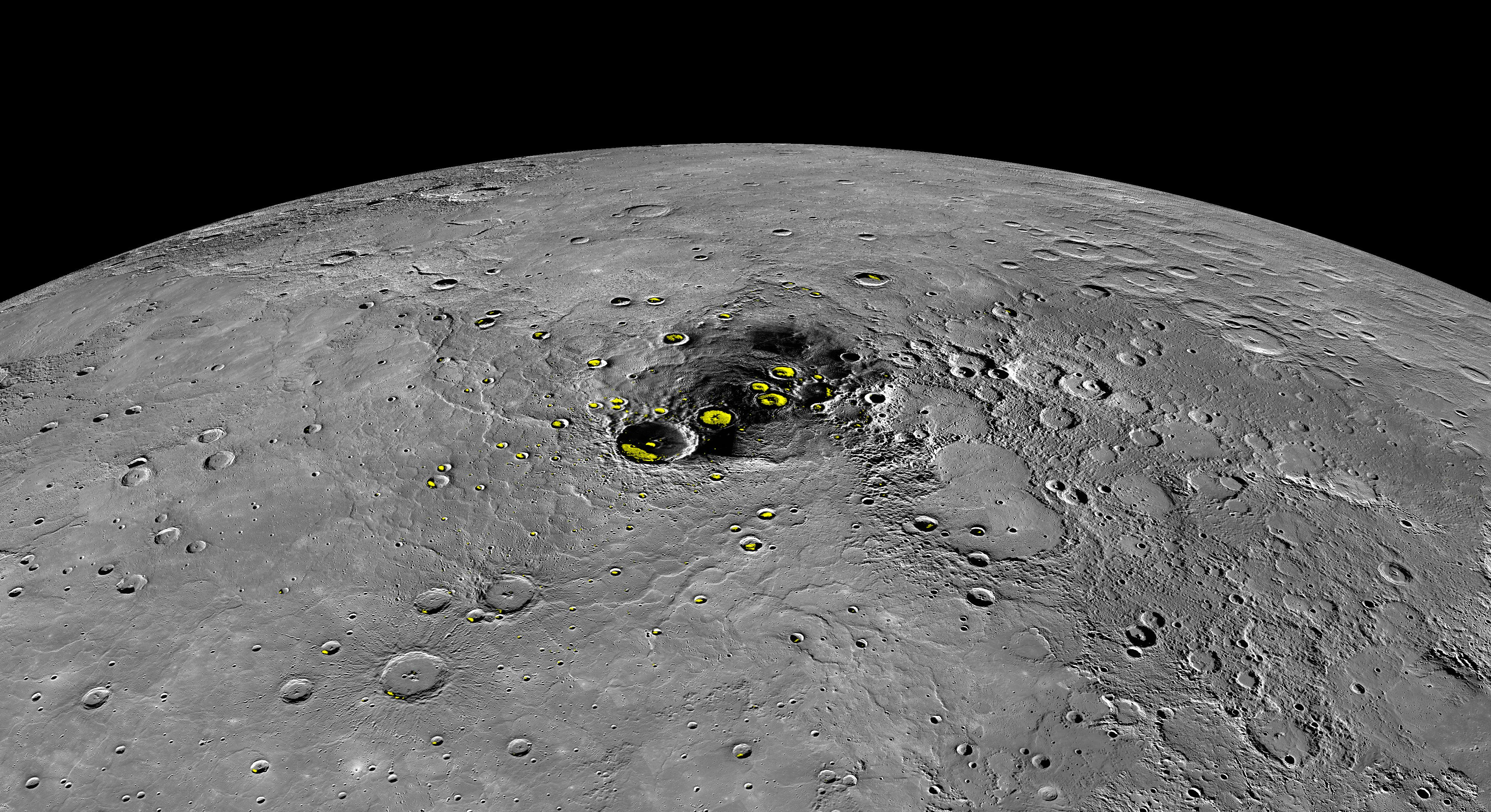
Water ice (yellow) in permanently shaded craters of Mercury's north polar region

X-ray fluorescence from the nightside and dayside surface of Mercury were detected using the X-Ray Spectrometer (XRS) on MESSENGER. These were attributed to precipitating electrons interacting with the surface.

=== Solar System portrait ===
On February 18, 2011, a portrait of the Solar System was published on the MESSENGER website. The mosaic contained 34 images, acquired by the MDIS instrument during November 2010. All the planets were visible with the exception of Uranus and Neptune, due to their vast distances from the Sun. The MESSENGER "family portrait" was intended to be complementary to the Voyager family portrait, which was acquired from the outer Solar System by Voyager 1 on February 14, 1990.

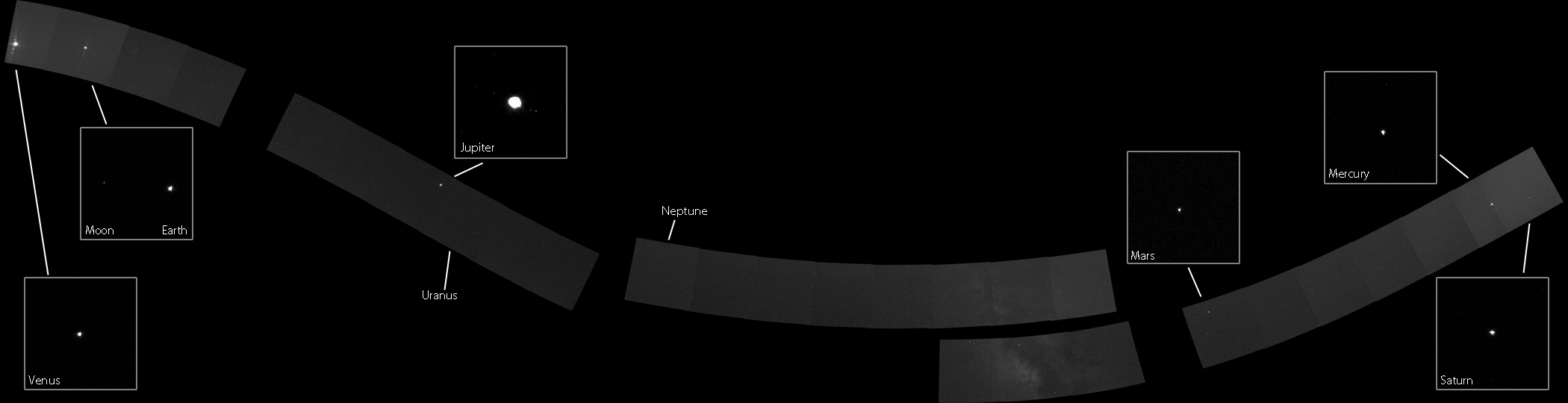
MESSENGER captured a near-complete portrait of the Solar System during November 2010.

=== View of a total lunar eclipse ===
A lunar eclipse as viewed from Mercury, captured from the MESSENGER spacecraft. The Moon can be seen falling into the shadow of Earth.

On October 8, 2014, from 9:18 UTC to 10:18 UTC, MESSENGER took 31 images, taken two minutes apart, of the Earth and the Moon, as the Moon underwent a total lunar eclipse. MESSENGER was 107 million kilometers (66 million miles) from the Earth at the time of the lunar eclipse. The Earth is about 5 pixels across and the Moon is just over 1 pixel across in the field of view of the NAC, with about 40 pixels distance between them. The images are zoomed by a factor of two and the Moon's brightness has been increased by a factor of about 25 to show its disappearance more clearly. This was the first observation of a lunar eclipse, of Earth's Moon, in history to be viewed from another planet.

== End of mission ==
After running out of propellant for course adjustments, MESSENGER entered its expected terminal phase of orbital decay in late 2014. The spacecraft's operation was extended by several weeks by exploiting its remaining supply of helium gas, which was used to pressurize its propellant tanks, as reaction mass. MESSENGER continued studying Mercury during its decay period. The spacecraft crashed onto the surface of Mercury on April 30, 2015, at 3:26 p.m. EDT (19:26 GMT), at a velocity of 14,080 km/h (8,750 mph), probably creating a crater in the planet's surface approximately 16 m (52 ft) wide. The spacecraft was estimated to have impacted at 54.4° N, 149.9° W on Suisei Planitia, near the crater Janáček. The crash occurred at a place not visible from Earth at the time, and thus was not detected by any observers or instruments. NASA confirmed the end of the MESSENGER mission at 3:40 p.m. EDT (19:40 GMT) after NASA's Deep Space Network did not detect the spacecraft's reemergence from behind Mercury.

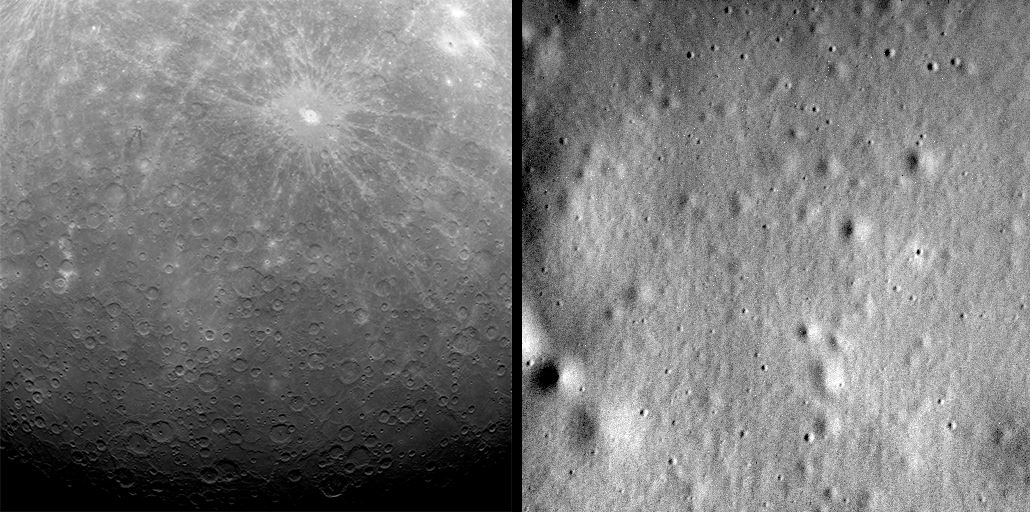
MESSENGER's first (March 29, 2011) and last (April 30, 2015) images from Mercury's orbit (impact details).

== See also ==
- BepiColombo, a European-Japanese mission to Mercury which was launched on October 19, 2018, and entered orbit on November 21, 2026
- Exploration of Mercury
- Mariner program
- Stamatios Krimigis, a NASA physicist and key contributor to the mission
