= Strindberg (crater) =

Crater on Mercury

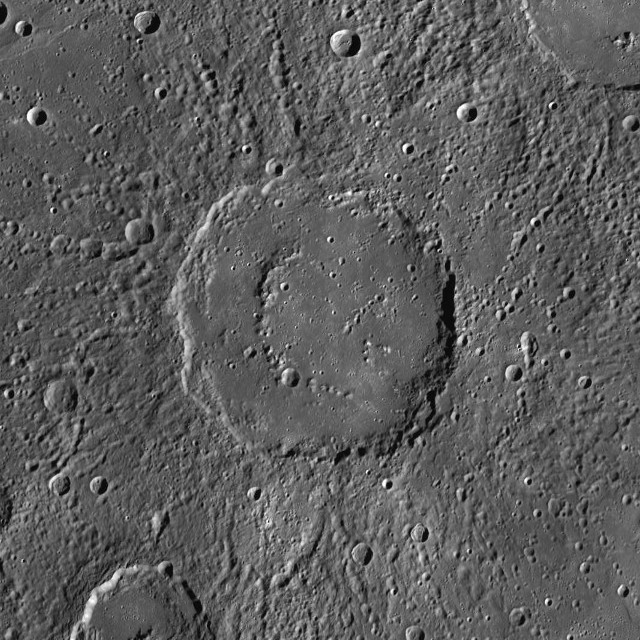
- MESSENGER WAC mosaic
- Planet: Mercury
- Coordinates: 53.4°N 136.7°W
- Quadrangle: Shakespeare
- Diameter: 189 km (117 mi)
- Eponym: August Strindberg

Strindberg is a 189 km diameter impact basin in the Shakespeare quadrangle of Mercury. It was named after the Swedish playwright, novelist and short story writer August Strindberg.

Strindberg is one of 110 peak ring basins on Mercury.

To the southwest is the large Shakespeare crater and further to the west is Janáček crater and Suisei Planitia.

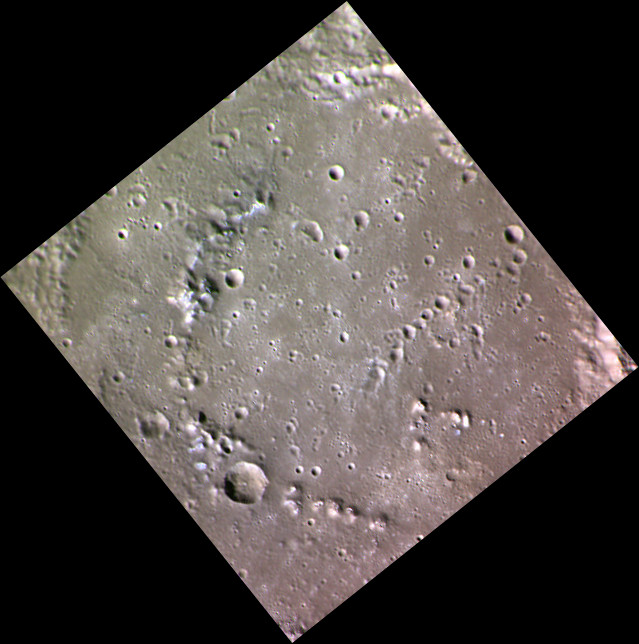
Approximate color image of the center of Strindberg.
