= Nizāmī (crater) =

Crater on Mercury

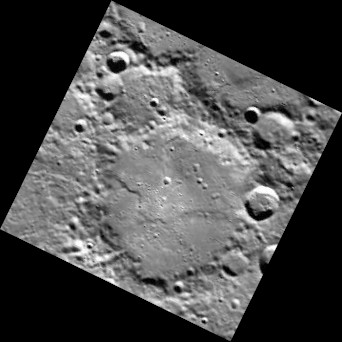
- MESSENGER WAC image of Nizāmī
- Feature type: Impact crater
- Location: Borealis quadrangle, Mercury
- Coordinates: 70.46°N 166.71°W
- Diameter: 77.0 km (47.8 mi)
- Eponym: Nizami Ganjavi

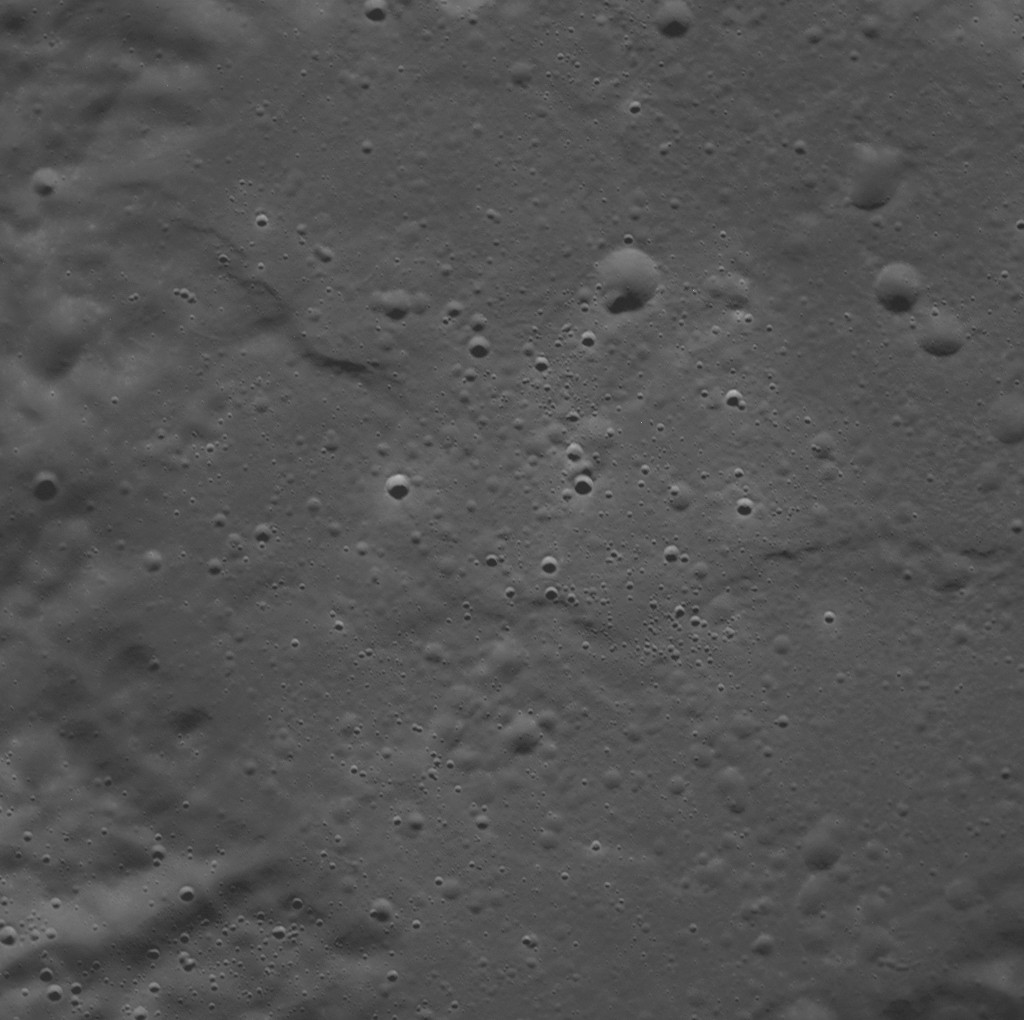
Nizāmī crater interior

Nizāmī is a crater on Mercury. Its name was adopted by the International Astronomical Union (IAU) in 1979. Nizami is named for the Persian poet Nizami Ganjavi, who lived from 1141 to 1209.

To the northwest of Nizāmī is Saikaku crater. To the north is Van Dijck, to the southwest is Martial, and to the south is the large crater Verdi.
