= Van Dijck (crater) =

Crater on Mercury

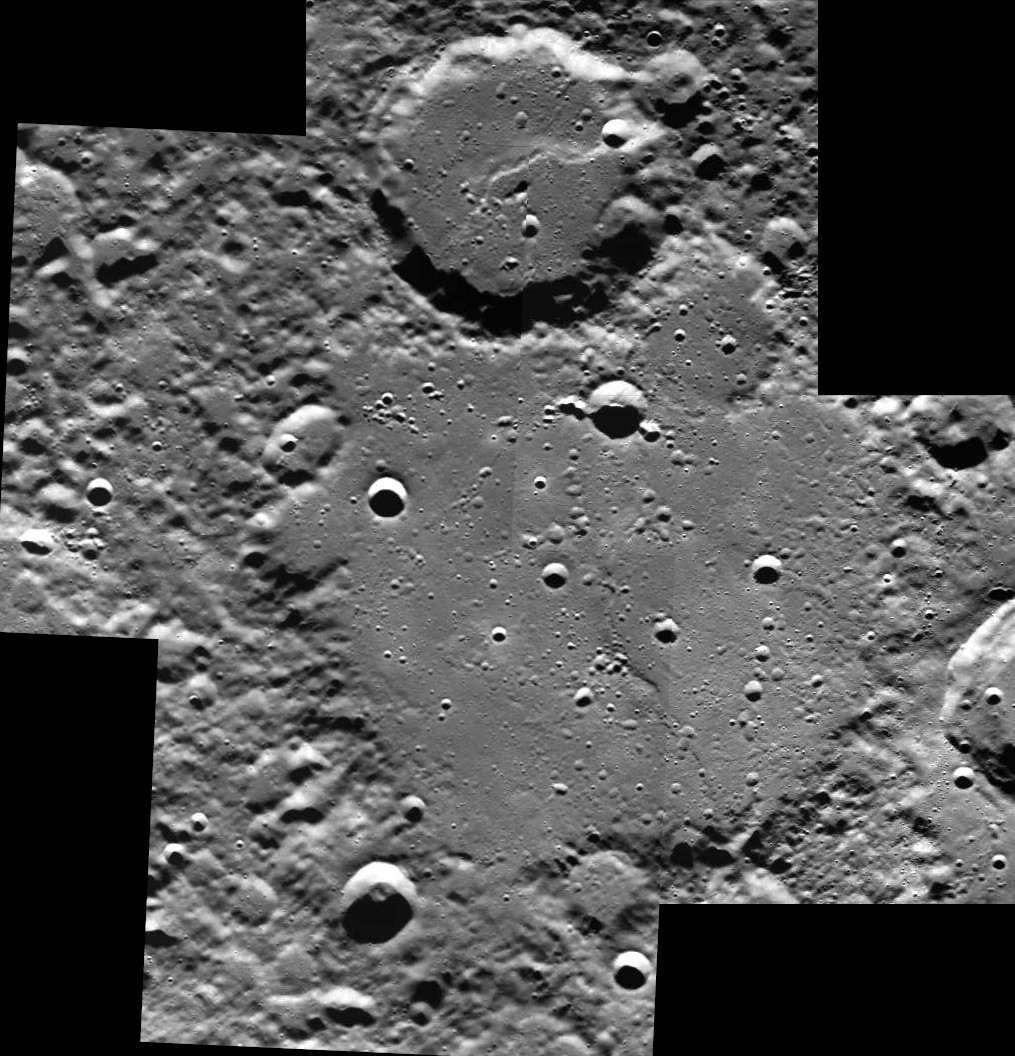
- MESSENGER WAC mosaic
- Planet: Mercury
- Coordinates: 75.80°N 166.63°W
- Quadrangle: Borealis
- Diameter: 101.53 km (63.09 mi)
- Eponym: Anthony van Dyck

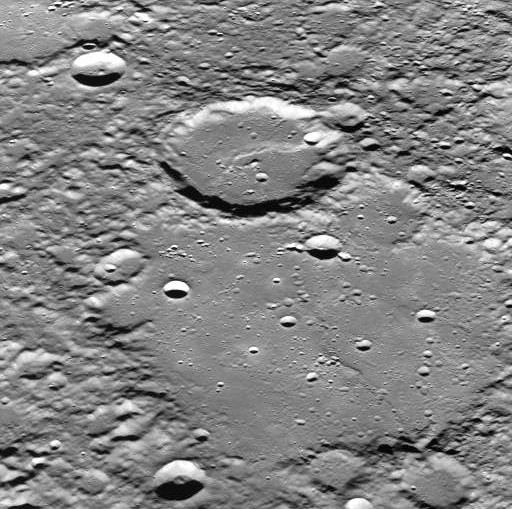
Oblique view

Van Dijck is a crater on Mercury, located near the north pole. Its name was adopted by the International Astronomical Union (IAU) in 1979. Van Dijck is named for Flemish painter Anthony van Dyck.

To the southwest of Van Dijck is Saikaku crater. To the south is Nizāmī, and to the northeast is Purcell.
