= Jiménez (crater) =

Crater on Mercury

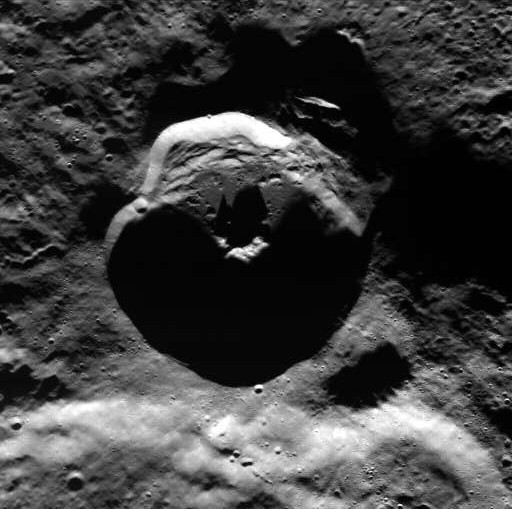
- MESSENGER WAC image
- Planet: Mercury
- Coordinates: 81.83°N 152.31°W
- Quadrangle: Borealis
- Diameter: 27 km
- Eponym: Juan Ramón Jiménez

Jiménez is a crater on Mercury, located near the north pole. Its name was adopted by the International Astronomical Union (IAU) in 2019. It is named for the Spanish poet and author Juan Ramón Jiménez.

Jiménez is located on the southwest rim of Rizal crater.
