= Kirby (crater) =

Crater on Mercury

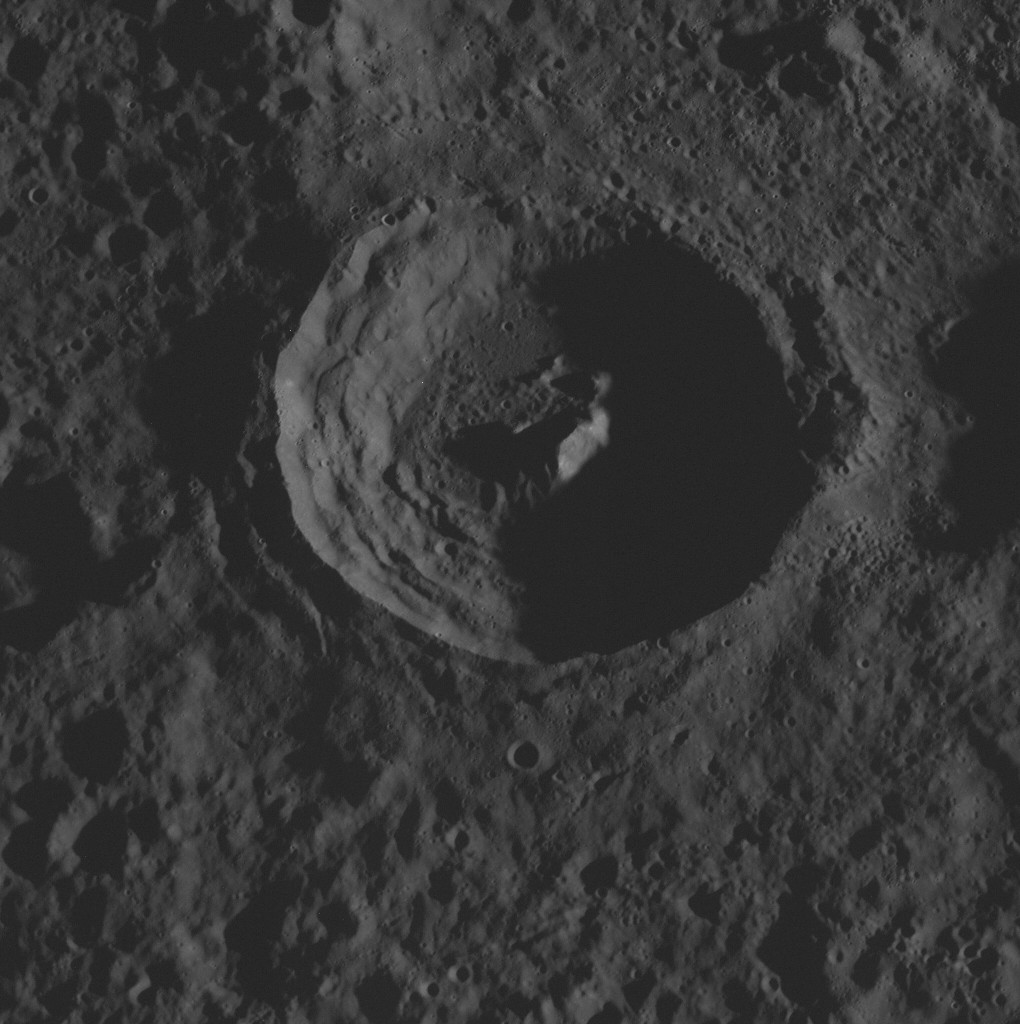
- Slightly oblique MESSENGER WAC image
- Planet: Mercury
- Coordinates: 82.96°N 151.32°W
- Quadrangle: Borealis
- Diameter: 31 km
- Eponym: Jack Kirby

Kirby is a crater on Mercury, located near the north pole. Its name was adopted by the International Astronomical Union (IAU) in 2019. It is named for the American illustrator Jack Kirby.

Kirby is located on the northwest rim of Rizal crater.
