= Martial (crater) =

Crater on Mercury

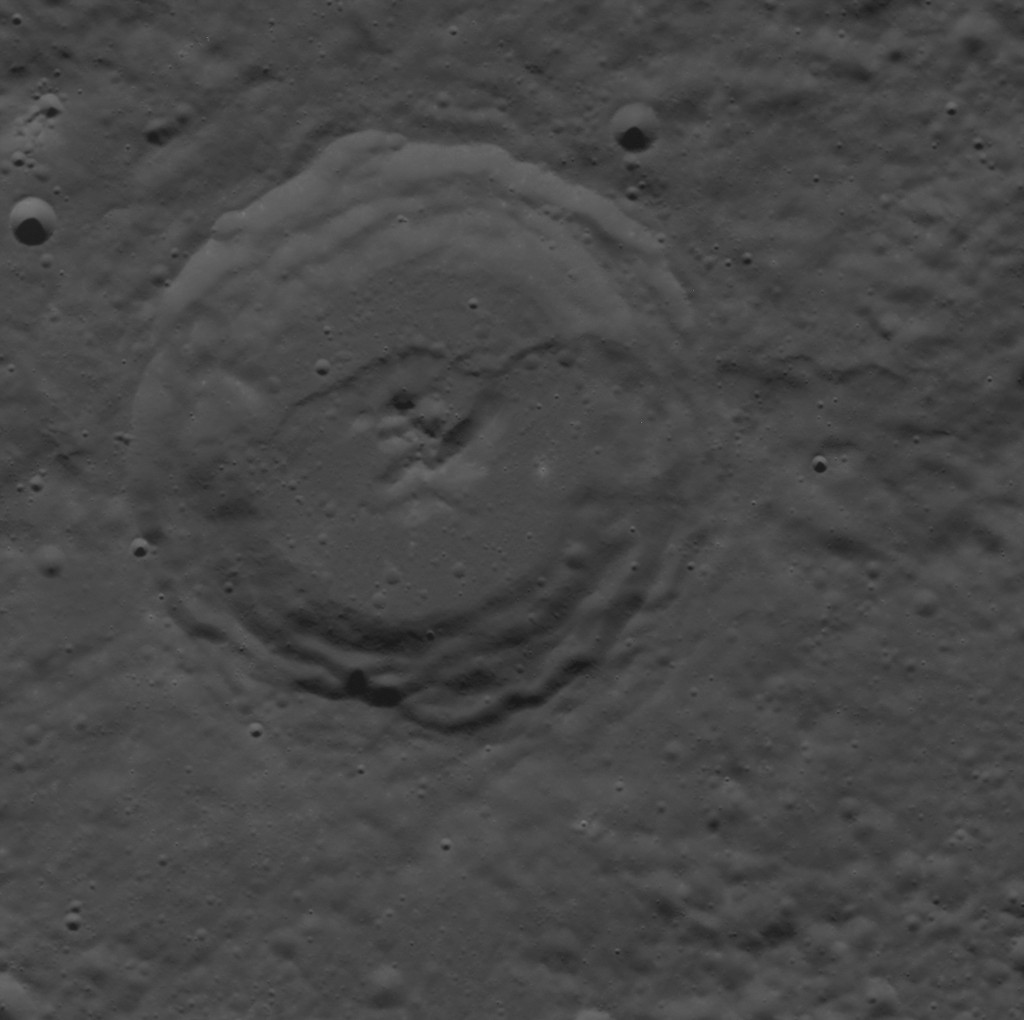
- MESSENGER WAC image of Martial
- Feature type: Central-peak impact crater
- Location: Borealis quadrangle, Mercury
- Coordinates: 68.47°N 178.33°W
- Diameter: 51.0 km (31.7 mi)
- Eponym: Martial

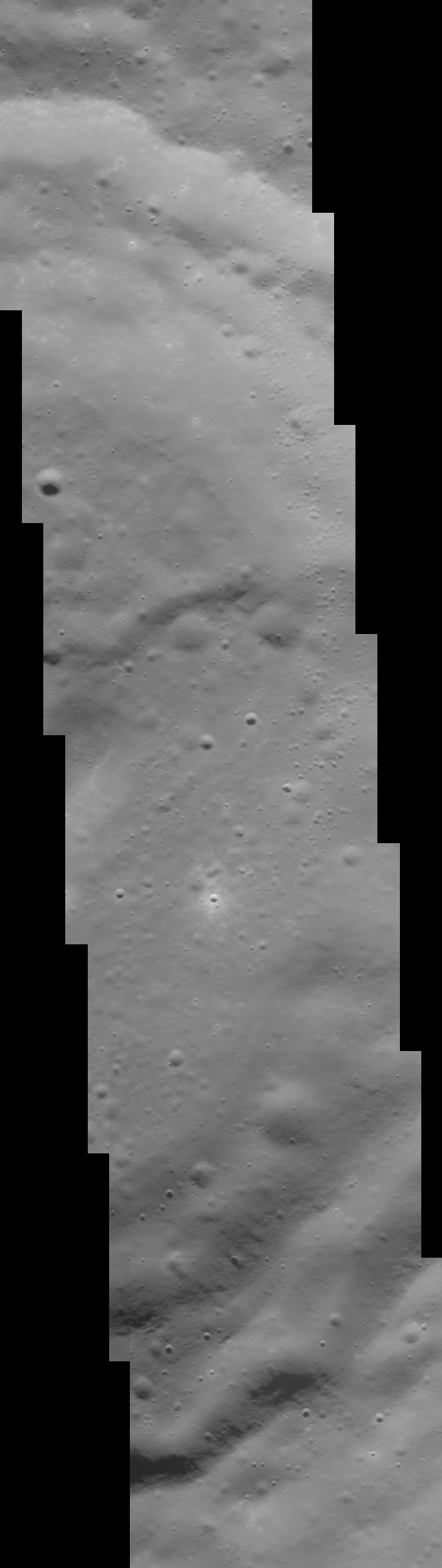
Mosaic of MESSENGER images of the east-central portion of the crater

Martial is a crater on Mercury. It has a diameter of 51 kilometers. Its name was adopted by the International Astronomical Union in 1979. Martial is named for the ancient Roman poet Martial, who lived from 40 to 103. The crater was first imaged by Mariner 10 in 1974.

To the north of Martial is Saikaku crater. To the southeast is the large crater Verdi.
