= Strindberg (disambiguation) =

August Strindberg (1849–1912), was a Swedish dramatist and painter.

Strindberg may also refer to:

== People ==
- Nils Strindberg (1872–1897), Swedish photographer
- Friedrich Strindberg (1897–1978), Swedish writer, son of Frida Uhl and Frank Wedekind, adopted by August
- Anita Strindberg (born 1937), Swedish actress
- Henrik Strindberg (born 1954), Swedish composer

== Other ==
- Strindberg Museum, Stockholm, Sweden
- Strindberg (crater), an impact basin in the Shakespeare quadrangle of Mercury
