= Rizal (crater) =

Crater on Mercury

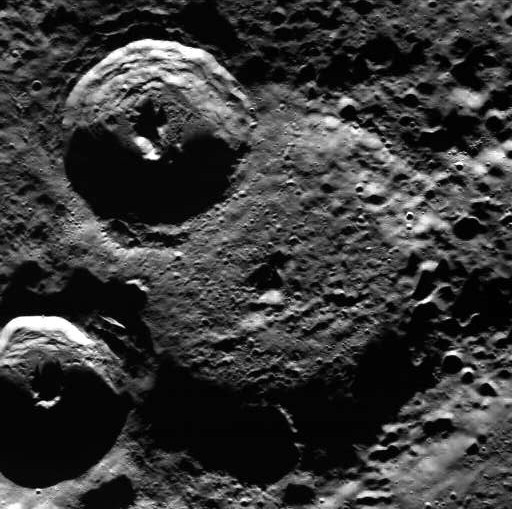
- MESSENGER WAC image
- Feature type: Impact crater
- Location: Borealis quadrangle, Mercury
- Coordinates: 82.48°N 146.98°W
- Diameter: 64 km
- Eponym: José Rizal

Rizal is a crater on Mercury, located near the north pole. Its name was adopted by the International Astronomical Union (IAU) in 2019. It is named for the Filipino writer José Rizal.

Kirby crater is located on the northwest rim of Rizal, and Jiménez is located on the southwest rim.
