= Suisei =

Suisei is Japanese for "comet" (彗星) and the Japanese name for the planet Mercury (水星). It may also stand for:

- Hoshimachi Suisei, Japanese virtual YouTuber
- Suisei (spacecraft), a Japanese space probe to Halley's Comet
- Yokosuka D4Y Suisei, a Japanese dive bomber

== See also ==
- Suisei Planitia
