= Purcell (crater) =

Crater on Mercury

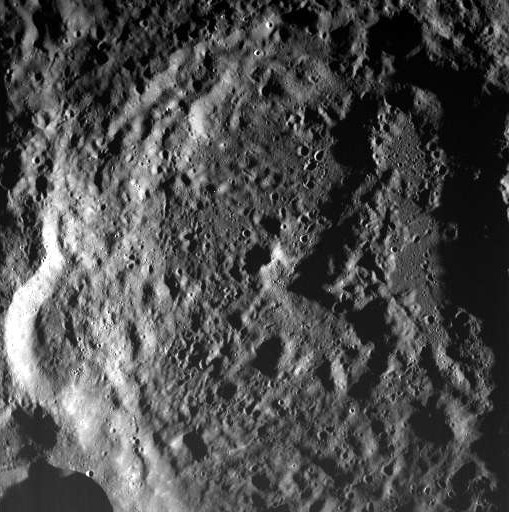
- MESSENGER WAC image
- Planet: Mercury
- Coordinates: 80.43°N 152.21°W
- Quadrangle: Borealis
- Diameter: 87.67 km
- Eponym: Henry Purcell

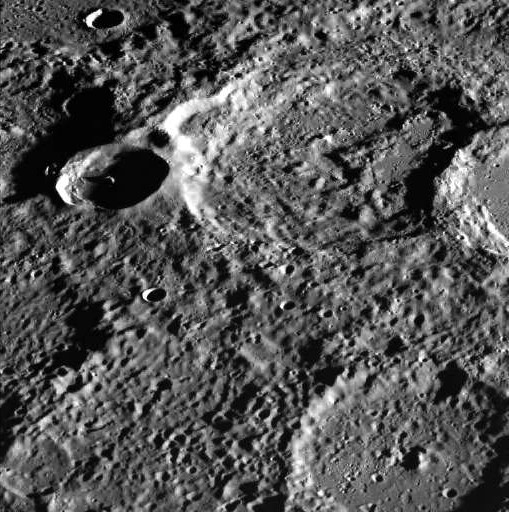
Oblique view

Purcell is a crater on Mercury, located near the north pole. Its name was adopted by the International Astronomical Union (IAU) in 1979. It is named for the English composer Henry Purcell.
