= Raditladi quadrangle =

Quadrangle on Mercury

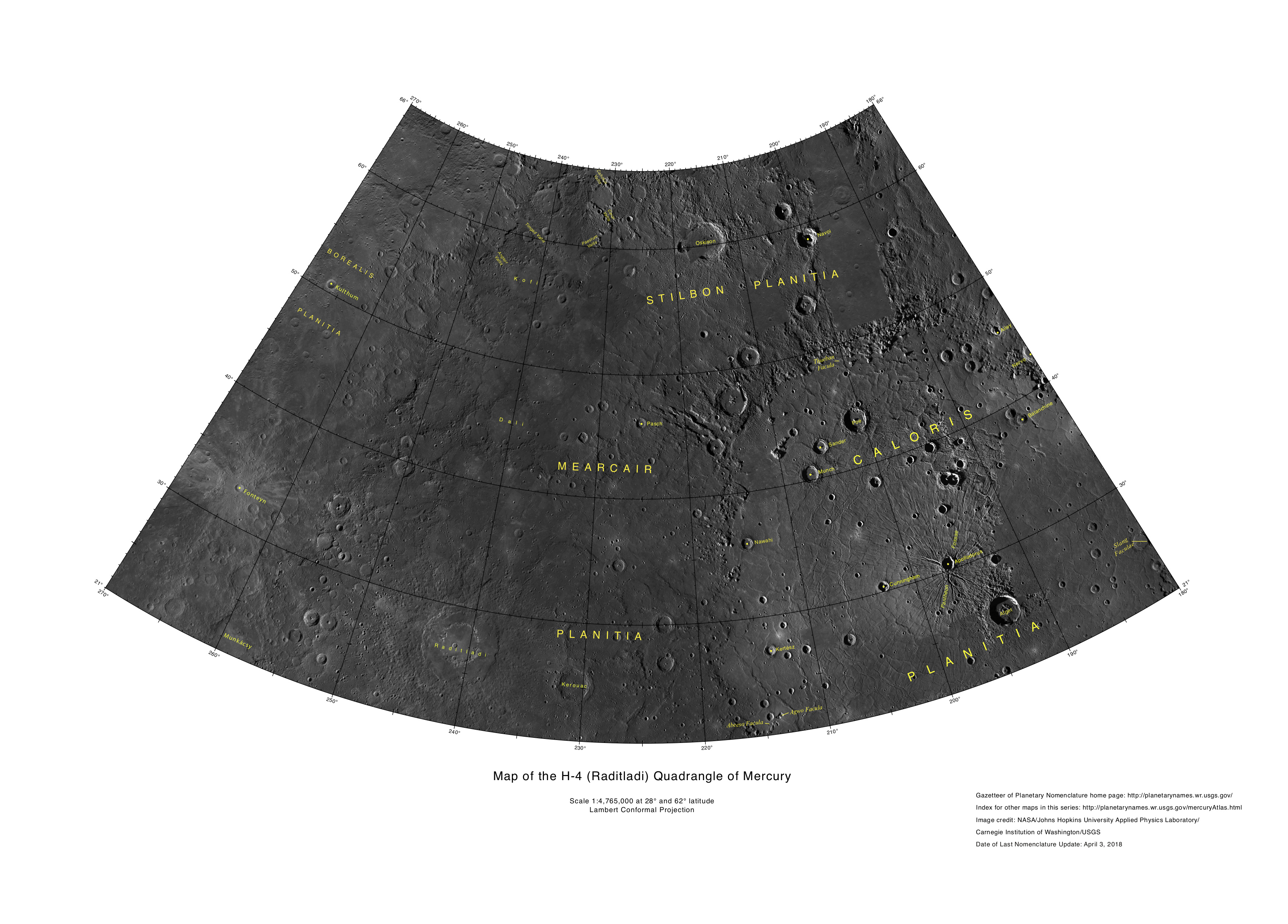
Raditladi quadrangle as mapped by the MESSENGER spacecraft

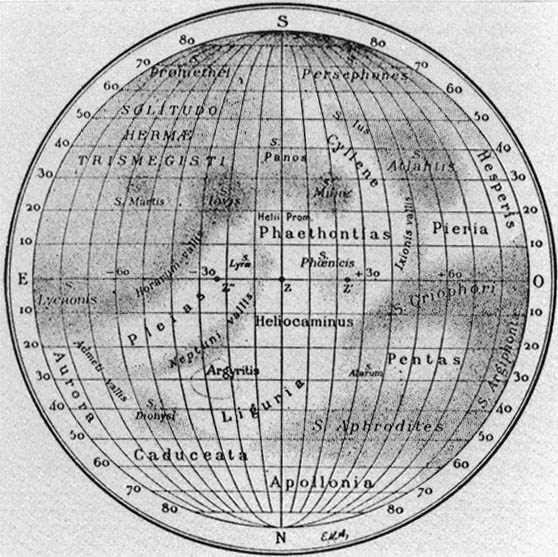
1934 map showing the Liguria albedo feature

The Raditladi quadrangle (H-4) is one of fifteen quadrangles on Mercury. It runs from 270 to 180° longitude and 20 to 70° latitude. Named after the Raditladi Basin, it was mapped in detail for the first time after MESSENGER entered orbit around Mercury in 2011. It had not been mapped prior to that point because it was one of the six quadrangles that was not illuminated (with the exception of a thin strip of its territory along the eastern border with Shakespeare quadrangle) when Mariner 10 made its flybys in 1974 and 1975. These six quadrangles continued to be known by their albedo feature names, with this one known as the Liguria quadrangle.

The Caloris basin is centered in Raditladi quadrangle, though it overlaps significantly with the Tolstoj and Shakespeare quadrangles.

The Borealis quadrangle is north of Raditladi quadrangle. To the west is Hokusai quadrangle, and to the east is Shakespeare quadrangle. To the southwest is Eminescu quadrangle, and to the southeast is Tolstoj quadrangle.

== Geological history ==
H-1 Borealis (features)
H-5 Hokusai (features)	H-4 Raditladi (features)	H-3 Shakespeare (features)		H-2 Victoria (features)
H-10 Derain (features)	H-9 Eminescu (features)	H-8 Tolstoj (features)	H-7 Beethoven (features)	H-6 Kuiper (features)
H-14 Debussy (features)	H-13 Neruda (features)	H-12 Michelangelo (features)		H-11 Discovery (features)
H-15 Bach (features)
