= Gauguin (crater) =

Crater on Mercury

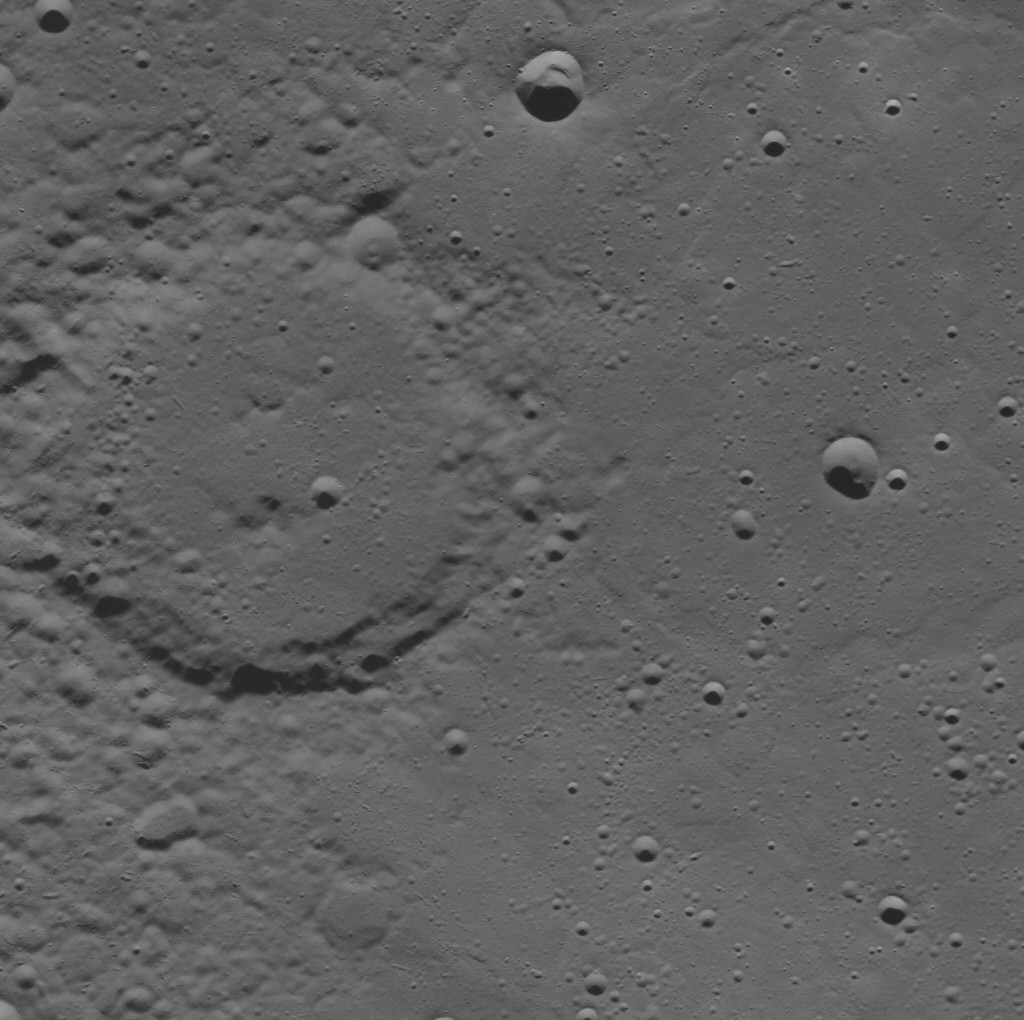
- MESSENGER WAC image
- Feature type: Impact crater
- Location: Borealis quadrangle, Mercury
- Coordinates: 66.36°N 100.01°W
- Diameter: 70 km (43 mi)
- Eponym: Paul Gauguin

Gauguin is a crater on Mercury. It has a diameter of 70 kilometers. Its name was adopted by the International Astronomical Union (IAU) in 1979. Gauguin is named for the French painter Paul Gauguin, who lived from 1848 to 1903. The crater was first imaged by Mariner 10 in 1974.
