= Brahms (crater) =

Crater on Mercury

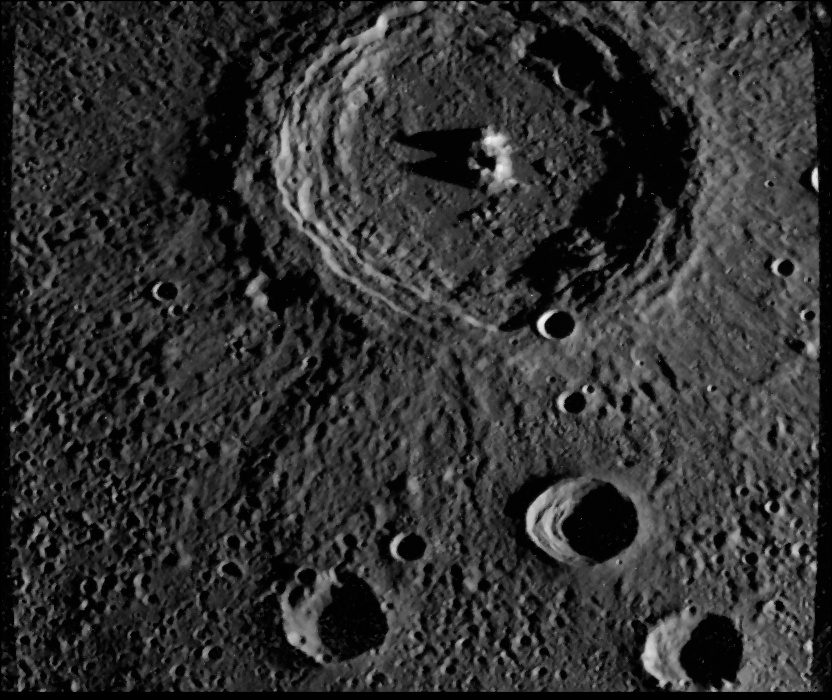
- Brahms at top Mariner 10 image
- Feature type: Central-peak impact crater
- Location: Shakespeare quadrangle, Mercury
- Coordinates: 58.32°N 177.36°W
- Diameter: 100 km (62 mi)
- Eponym: Johannes Brahms

Brahms is a crater on Mercury. It has a diameter of 100 kilometers. Its name was adopted by the International Astronomical Union (IAU) in 1979. Brahms is named for the German composer Johannes Brahms, who lived from 1833 to 1897. The crater was first imaged by Mariner 10 in 1974.

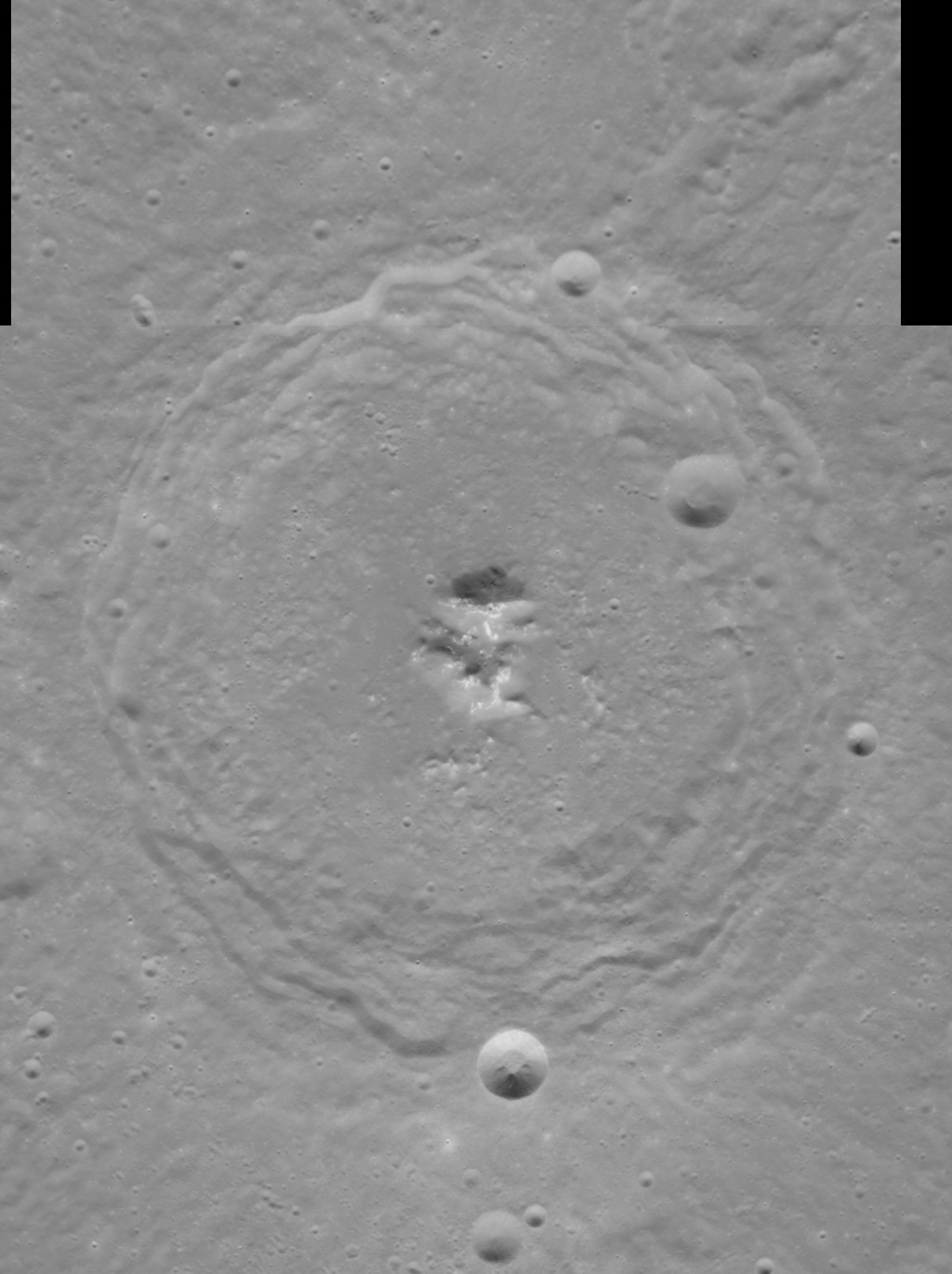
MESSENGER mosaic

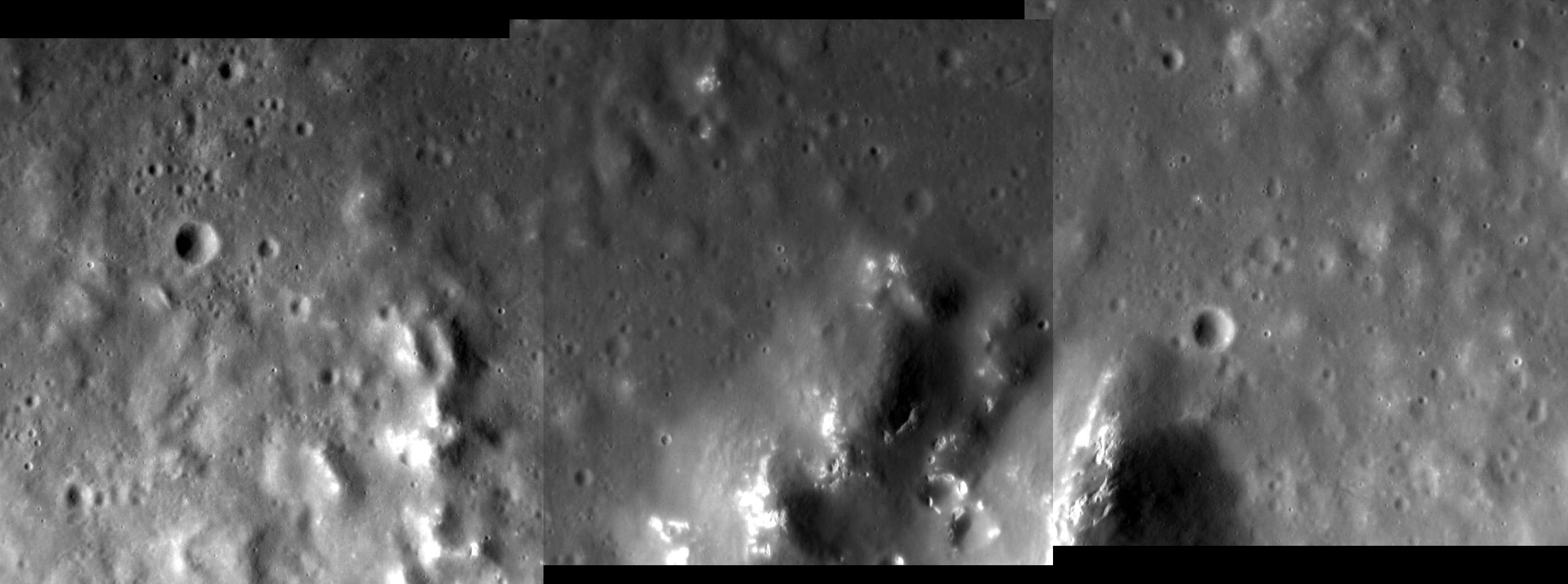
Part of the central peaks showing hollows
