= Verdi (crater) =

Crater on Mercury

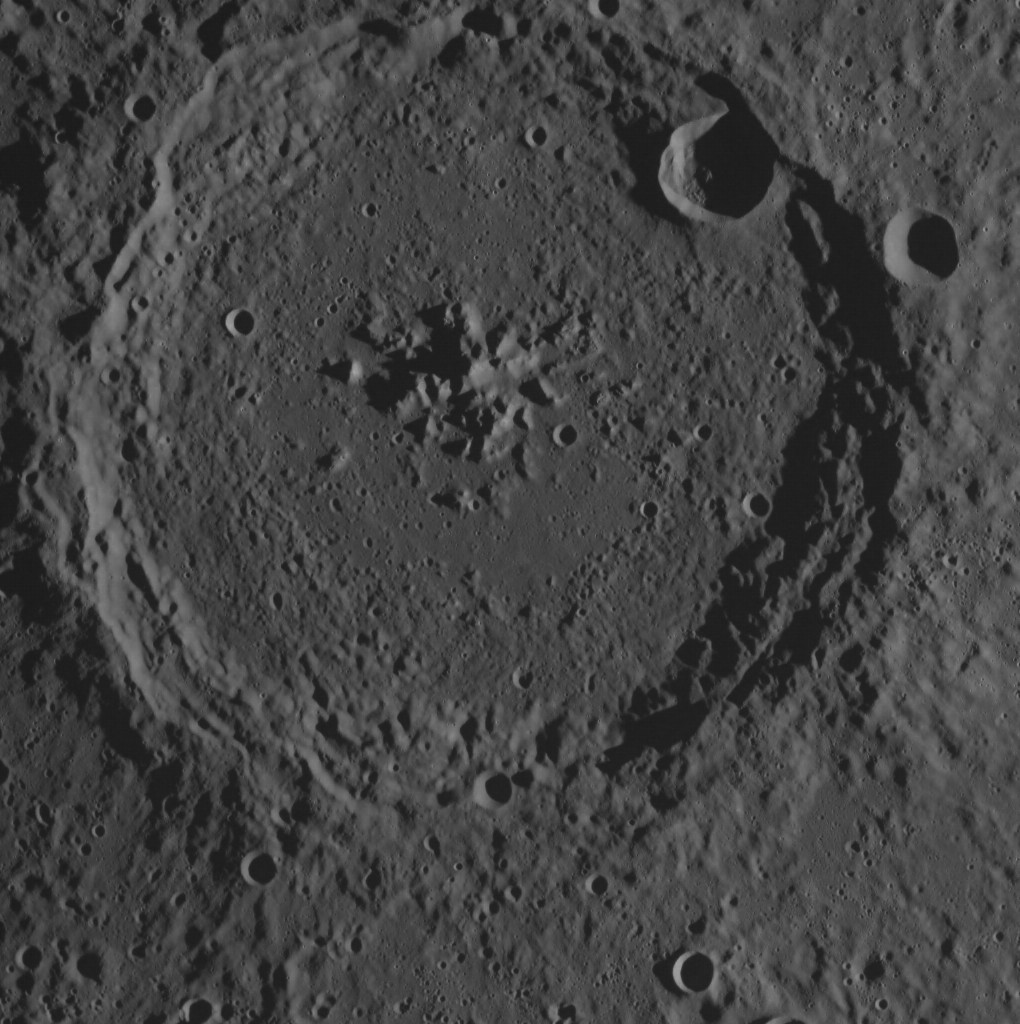
- MESSENGER WAC image
- Feature type: Central-peak impact crater
- Location: Shakespeare quadrangle, Mercury
- Coordinates: 64.36°N 169.71°W
- Diameter: 145 km (90 mi)
- Eponym: Giuseppe Verdi

Verdi is an impact crater on the planet Mercury. It was named after Italian Romantic composer Giuseppe Verdi (1813–1901) in 1979, as recognized by the International Astronomical Union. The crater's extensive ejecta blanket and secondary crater field are superposed on plains materials and older craters.

Verdi lies in the northern section of the Shakespeare quadrangle and is relatively large for a Mercurian crater, with a low rim and shallow floor. The crater has a diameter of about 145 km (90 mi), although estimates of its size have varied. Like its neighbour, Brahms, Verdi is "a complex crater with a central peak and terraced walls" and has several secondary craters. Another key feature of the crater is its discontinuous inner rings.

Verdi was first imaged by Mariner 10, a robotic space probe launched in the early 1970s to survey Venus and Mercury. Verdi and most of the planet's other craters were photographed in 2011 by the MESSENGER mission, a probe sent by NASA to orbit and photograph the planet.

Verdi is one of several craters on Mercury named after famous composers. Other examples in the Shakespeare quadrangle include Brahms (after Johannes Brahms), Scarlatti (after Domenico Scarlatti), and Couperin (after Francois Couperin). A number of Mercurian craters are named after historic cultural figures from different fields, including literature, philosophy, and art, but others feature names from popular culture, including Walt Disney (Disney crater) and Muddy Waters (Waters crater).

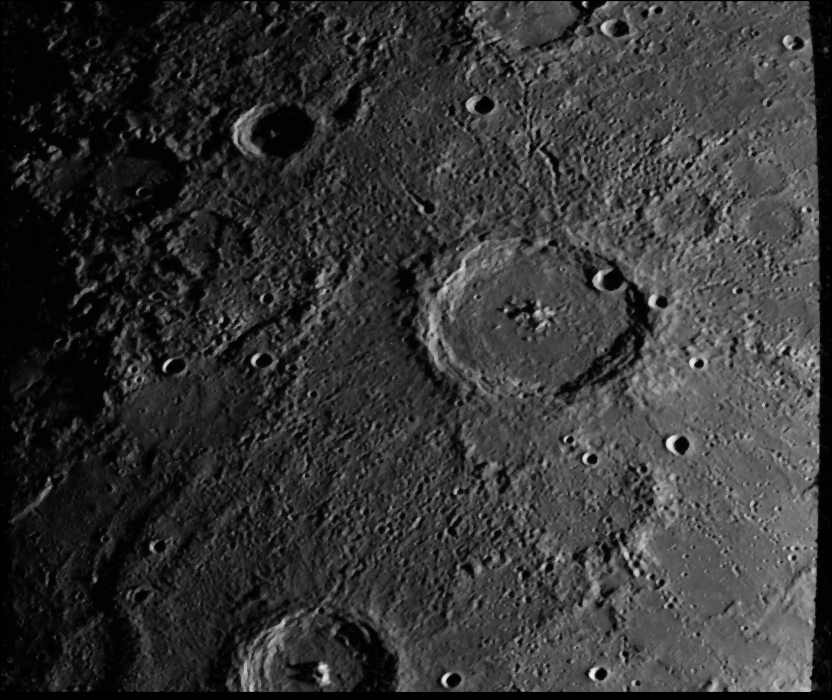
Mariner 10 image with Verdi crater near center

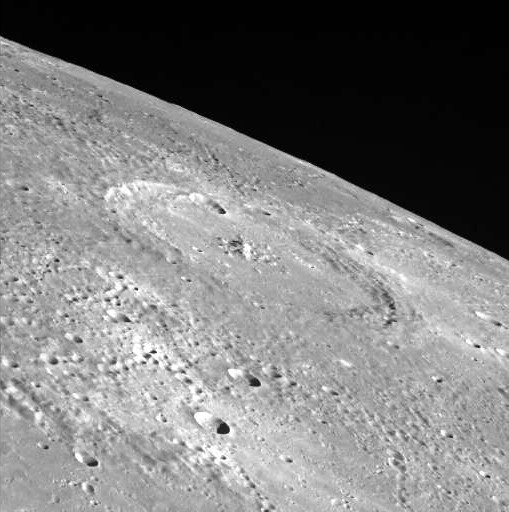
Oblique view

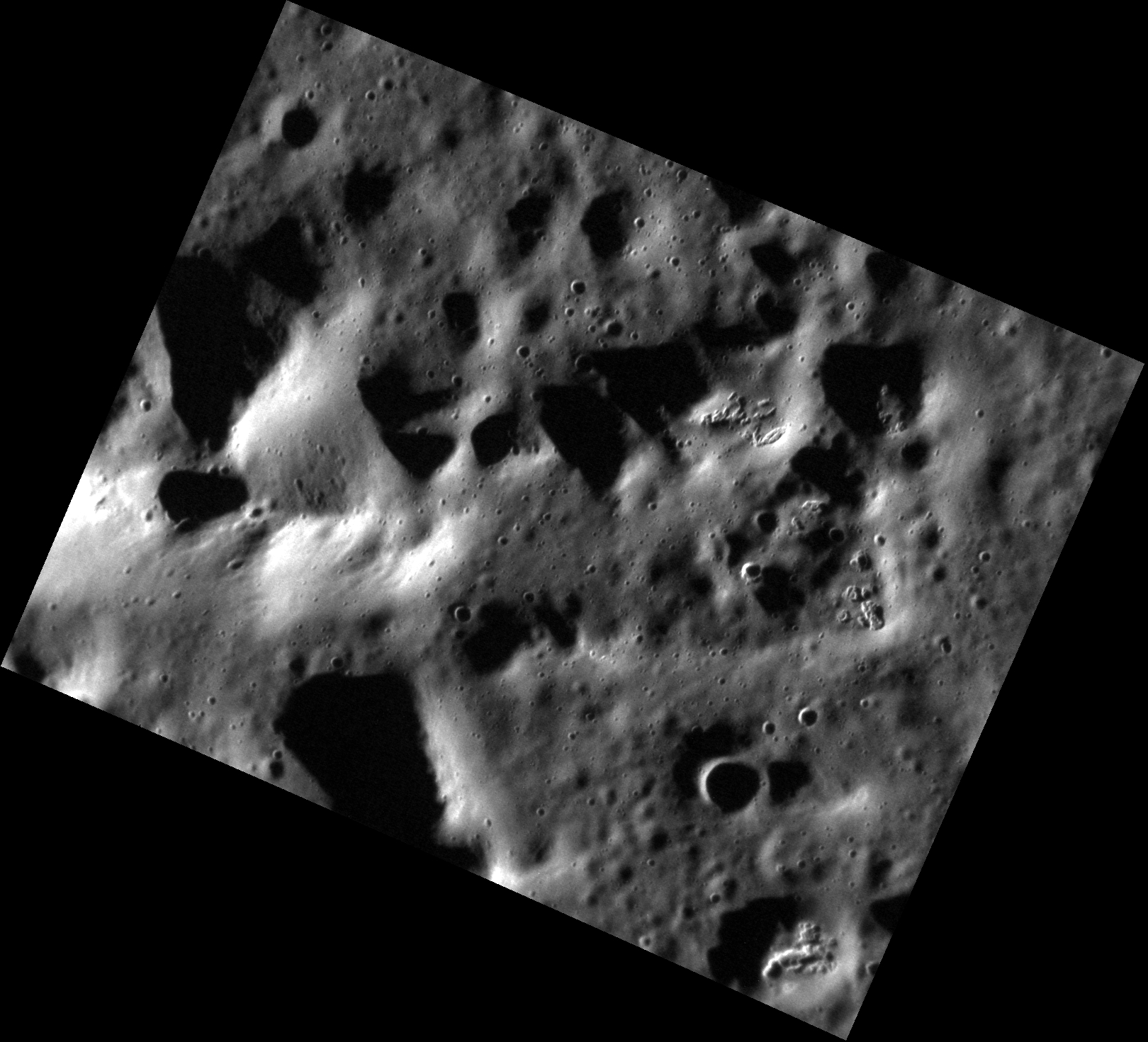
Verdi crater hollows
