= Borealis quadrangle =

Quadrangle on Mercury

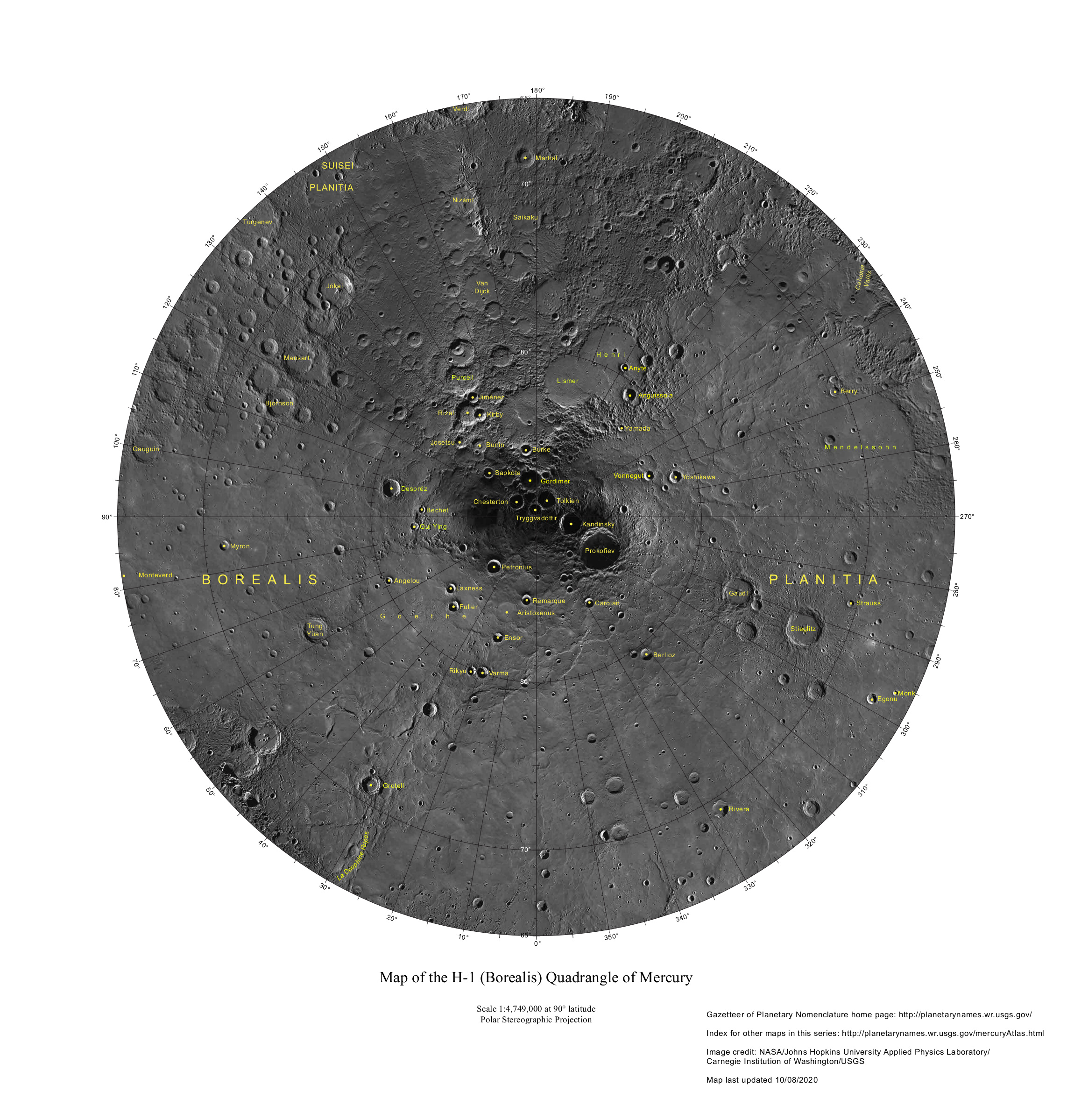
Borealis quadrangle as mapped by the MESSENGER spacecraft

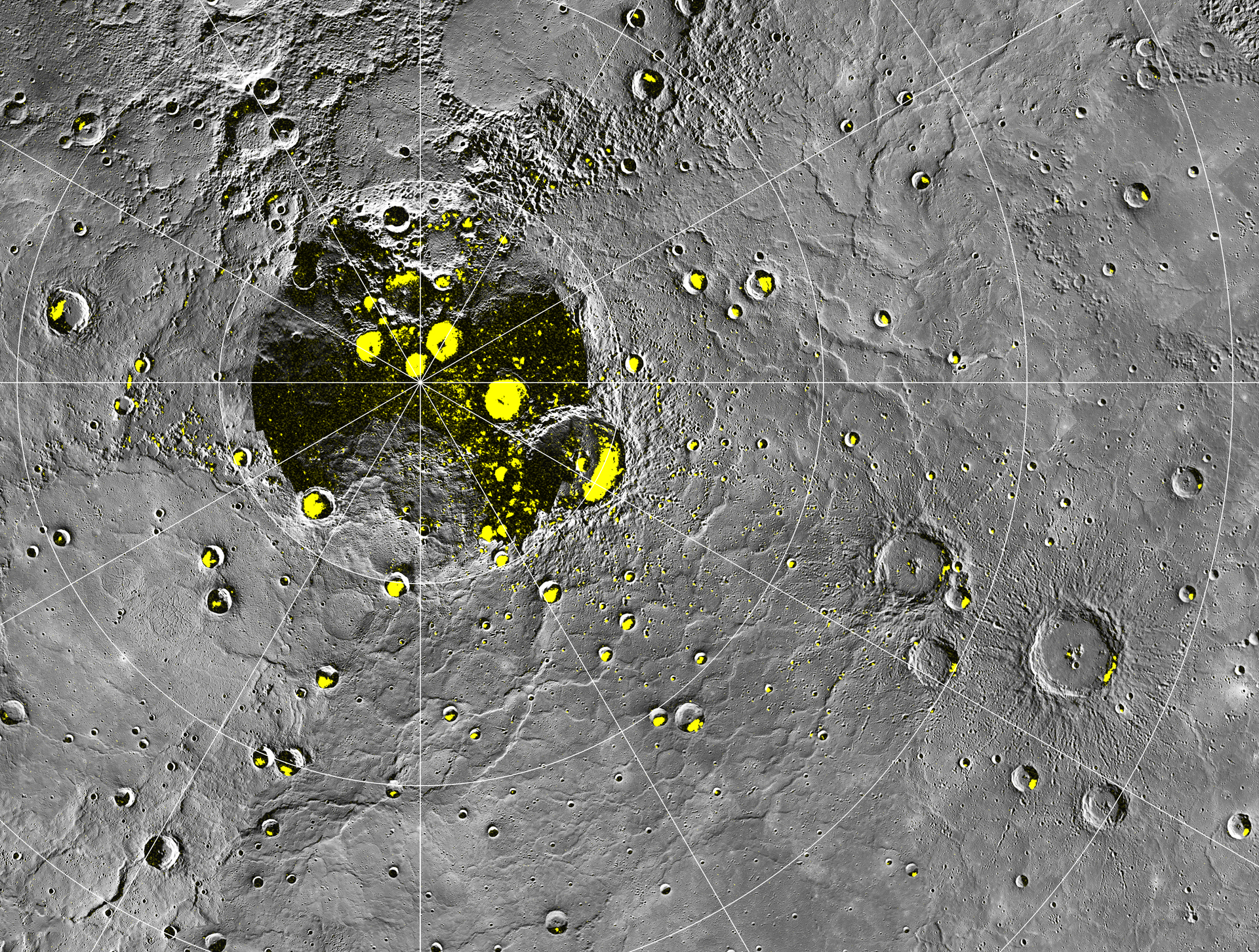
Mercury’s north polar region made from the Arecibo Observatory is shown in yellow on a mosaic of MESSENGER orbital images. Radar-bright features all collocate with areas mapped as in shadow by MESSENGER, consistent with the proposal that radar-bright materials contain water ice.

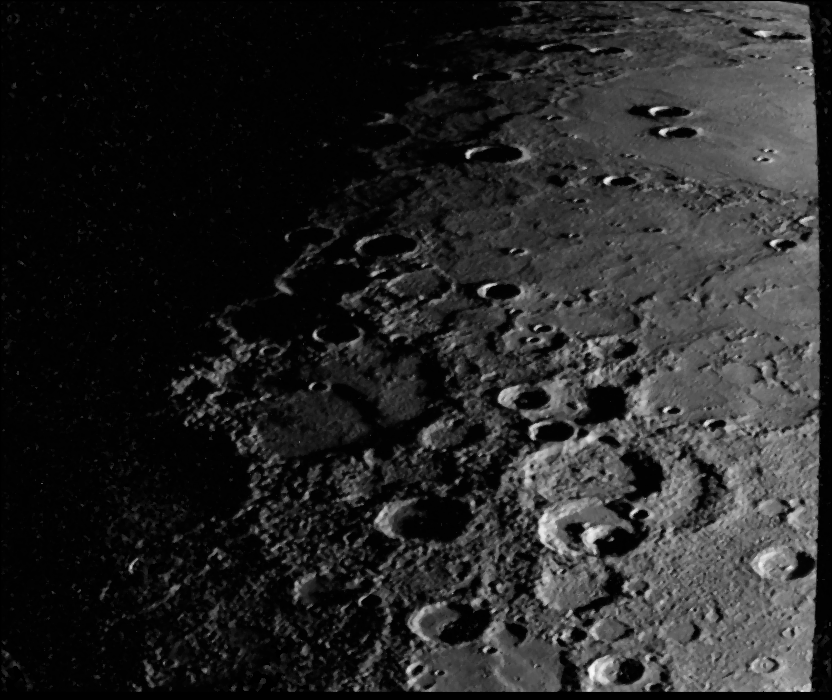
Mariner 10 image of the polar region

The Borealis quadrangle is a quadrangle on Mercury surrounding the north pole down to 65° latitude. It was mapped in its entirety by the MESSENGER spacecraft, which orbited the planet from 2008 to 2015, excluding areas of permanent shadow near the north pole. Only approximately 25% of the quadrangle was imaged by the Mariner 10 spacecraft during its flybys in 1974 and 1975. The quadrangle is now called H-1.

It contains the Goethe Basin, whose diameter of at least 400 km (250 mi) makes it the sixth-largest impact basin observed on Mariner 10 images(Murray and others, 1974; Boyce and Grolier, 1977; Strom, 1977). The west half of the mapped area (between long 100° and 190° W.) is dominated by older craters and by intercrater plains material that lies between and within them. Younger crater materials, intermediate plains material, and small patches of smooth plains material are superposed on all other units. The crater Verdi, 122 km (76 mi) in diameter, is the largest of the younger craters. Its extensive ejecta blanket and secondary crater field are superposed on plains materials and older craters.

The east half of the mapped area (between long 0° and 100° W.) is characterized by smooth plains material (Murray and others, 1974). This unit covers vast expanses of Borealis Planitia, a depression about 1,000 km (620 mi) in diameter that has an irregular arcuate west boundary. This depression is located over the site(s) of one or several old impact structures (Boyce and Grolier, 1977).

Adjacent quadrangles to the south of Borealis are Victoria quadrangle (0° to 90° W), Shakespeare quadrangle (90° to 180° W), Raditladi quadrangle (180° to 270° W), and Hokusai quadrangle (270° to 0° W). It is opposite the Bach quadrangle at the south pole.

== Mariner 10 images ==
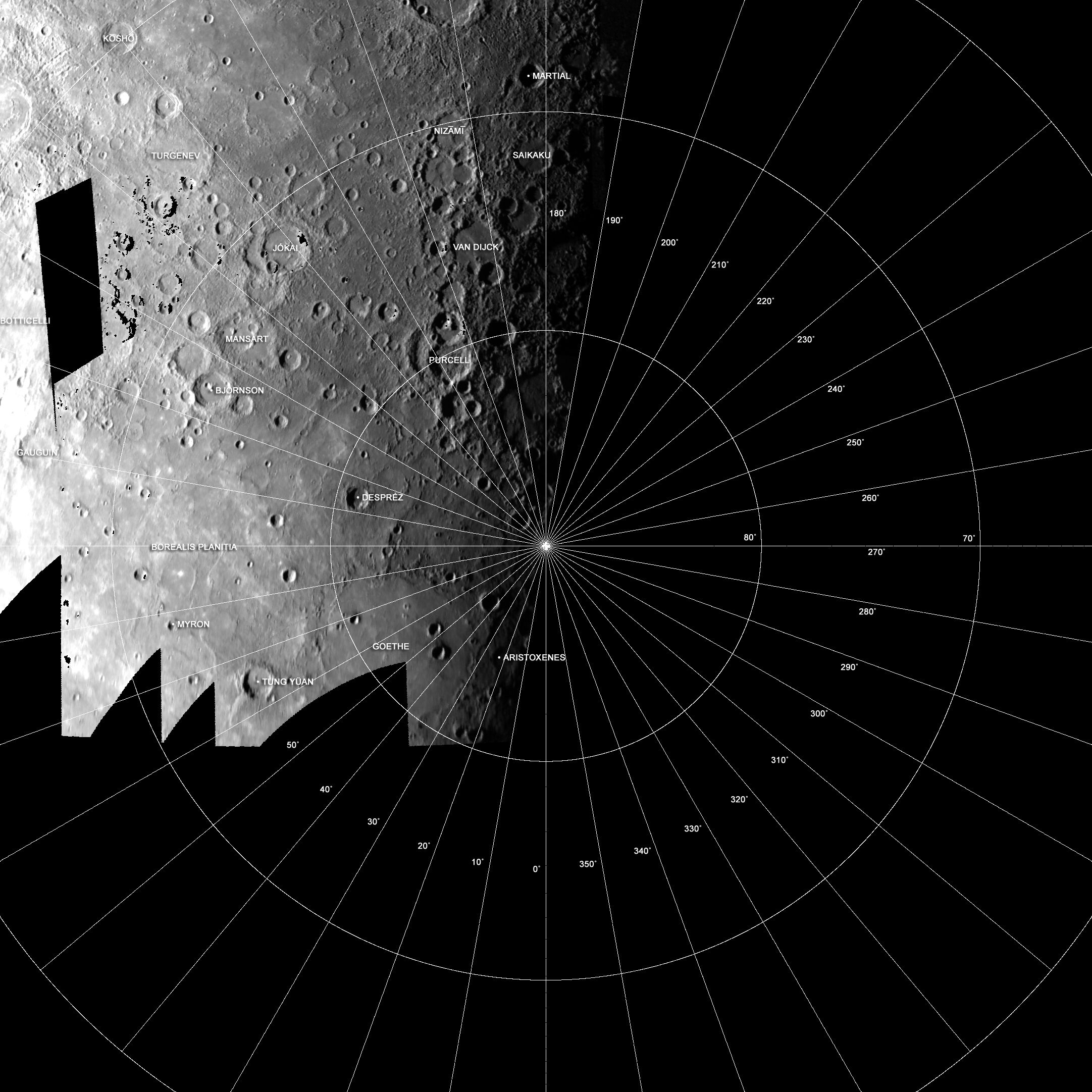
Photomosaic of Mariner 10 images

In the Borealis region, Mariner 10 images are available for only the western hemisphere, from long 0° to about long 190° W. Mercury was in darkness beyond long 190° W. on March 29, 1974, when the first Mariner 10 flyby acquired the most useful photographs of the region. Most of the photographs used for geologic mapping were acquired by the departing spacecraft during the first pass (Mercury I). The Mercury II encounter provided no usable images of the map area; two low-oblique photographs suitable for geologic mapping were acquired during the third flyby on March 17, 1975. No stereoscopic photographic pairs are available for the Borealis region.

Because the terminator was a few degrees away from the 0°-180° meridian at the time of the first encounter, photographs of the region were acquired under a wide range of lighting conditions. These conditions and the large obliquity of the photographs hampered geologic interpretation of surface materials in the map area, as they did in the Kuiper (De Hon and others, 1981), Victoria (McGill and King, 1983), and Shakespeare (Guest and Greeley, 1983) quadrangles to the south.

== Climate ==
Mercury's equatorial plane is inclined less than 2° to its orbital plane (Klaasen, 1976; Murray and others, 1981, p. 28); its rotation period of 58.64 terrestrial days is in two-thirds resonance with its orbital period of 87.97 terrestrial days (Colombo, 1965; Colombo and Shapiro, 1966). The resulting lag and orbital eccentricity create a variation of mean temperature not only with latitude, as on the Earth, but also with longitude. However, because of Mercury's relatively slow rotational period, diurnal variations in temperature probably greatly exceed mean-temperature variations along latitude and longitude, even in the high latitudes. Its pronounced orbital eccentricity (0.2563) causes the apparent solar intensity at Mercury to vary by more than a factor of 2 throughout a Mercurian year, corresponding to about a 20 percent change in equilibrium temperature. Further, conservation of orbital angular momentum and spin-orbit coupling cause considerable variation in the length of daylight. Dawns and sunsets are prolonged by the long transit time of the Mercurian horizon across the solar disk, so that daylight is lengthened and nighttime reduced by several terrestrial days at sunset and vice versa at sunrise (Robert Wildey, U.S. Geological Survey, oral commun., 1982). Despite these considerations and despite the daily range in surface temperatures of several hundred kelvins, the subsurface temperature in the polar regions always remains well below freezing (Murray, 1975).

== Stratigraphy ==
Within the Borealis region, three widespread plains units are recognized largely by their obvious differences in crater density, which is closely related to relative age (Soderblom and Boyce, 1972). From most heavily cratered (oldest) to least cratered (youngest), these units are intercrater plains material, intermediate plains material, and smooth plains material. Visual identification is confirmed and refined by actual crater counts. If one uses the lunar surface as a frame of reference, the crater density of Mercurian plains in the Borealis region is bracketed by that of the lunar uplands, the most heavily cratered lunar surface, and that of Oceanus Procellarum, a moderately cratered lunar mare surface. The curve for the lunar uplands was derived from crater counts in the region northwest of crater Tsiolkovskiy, between crater Mendeleev and Mare Smithii. The curve for the southeastern part of Oceanus Procellarum was obtained in an area centered near lat 2°00' N. and long 31°00'W., south of the crater Kunowsky. Ocean Procellarum has long been considered close to the "average lunar mare" (Hartmann, 1966, 1967); its crater density is intermediate between those of the heavily cratered Mare Tranquillitatis and the lightly cratered Mare Serenitatis.

Material of Borealis Planitia was not included in the smooth plains count because images of the area were blurred by spacecraft motion, and so reliable crater counts could not be obtained. However, smooth plains south of lat 65° N. in the Shakespeare quadrangle, in the crater Strindberg and in Suisei Planitia, are included in these counts. The plains materials that lie outside Borealis Planitia are distributed in irregular belts, which are subparallel to the terminator and to one another. Eastward from long 190° W., the following belt pattern is observed: intercrater plains material, intermediate plains material, and again intercrater plains material. All three belts extend southward into the Shakespeare quadrangle (Guest and Greeley, 1983).

Distinguishing one type of plains material from another by variations in roughness and crater density is highly dependent on the resolution and lighting conditions of individual Mariner frames (Schaber and McCauley, 1980). This constraint is well documented for the Moon (Masursky and others, 1978, p. 80–81) and for Mars (Boyce and others, 1976). In the Borealis region, where intercrater and intermediate plains materials were imaged at an increasingly low sun angle close to the terminator, the number of observable small craters increase with decreasing distance from the terminator and concomitantly decreasing sun angle. This discrepancy in the apparent abundance of craters occurs only for craters that have small diameters and can be obviated by counting only craters larger than 3 km (1.9 mi) in diameter.

=== Older plains materials ===
The intercrater plains material is the oldest recognizable map unit in the Borealis region. It lies between large craters from about long 155° to long 190° W., and it also occurs between clusters of closely packed and overlapping large craters west of crater Gauguin and south and southeast of crater Mansart. The unit was described originally by Trask and Guest, who considered it to be the most widespread unit on Mercury; Strom reported that this material covers one-third of the surface viewed by Mariner 10. The principal morphologic characteristic of the intercrater plains material is the high density of superposed craters 5 to 10 km in diameter, which are commonly shallow and elongate; probably they are secondary craters derived from nearby large primary craters that are superposed on the unit. As one group, the large craters and associated intercrater plains form some of the heavily cratered terrain defined by Trask and Guest.

The relative age and nature of intercrater plains material are as uncertain in the Borealis region as they are elsewhere on Mercury. Strom noted the similarity in surficial morphologies between mercurian intercrater plains and pre-Imbrian pitted plains south-southwest of Mare Nectaris on the Moon (Wilhelms and McCauley, 1971; Scott, 1972). The pits in the lunar pre-Imbrian pitted plains are similar to the small secondaries that pepper the surface of Mercurian intercrater plains material. On the Moon, pre-Imbrian pitted plains material embays the Janssen Formation (Scott, 1972), whose base is defined as the base of the Nectarian System (Stuart-Alexander and Wilhelms, 1975). However, the crater density of the intercrater plains material in the Borealis region matches that of an area on the far side of the Moon, in the region northwest of crater Tsiolkovskiy bounded by crater Mendeleev and Mare Smithii. This area is dominated by pre-Nectarian unmantled terra and pre-Nectarian and Nectarian craters (Wilhelms and El- Baz, 1977). The similarity in crater density of intercrater plains material on Mercury and of pre-Nectarian terrain on the Moon is geologically significant, inasmuch as it shows that the oldest recognizable surfaces on both Mercury and the Moon went through similar stages of crustal cratering, but not necessarily at the same absolute geologic time. Differences in crater density as well as embayment relations in the Borealis region show that the intercrater plains material and the smoother intermediate plains material are younger than many craters in the area northeast of crater Turgenev, and older than smooth plains material in Borealis Planitia.

The relative age of intercrater plains material has a bearing on its origin. If very old, intercrater plains material may consist of anorthosite derived from a magma ocean such as may have existed on the Moon (Wood and others, 1970). If emplaced during later stages of mercurian evolution, it may consist of basin ejecta or lava flows. However, planetwide, the morphologic evidence for an impact origin rather than a volcanic one is not compelling. Whether or not either hypothesis is eventually substantiated, the emplacement of intercrater plains material likely began during an early stage of intense accretionary bombardment (Guest and O’Donnell, 1977) and lasted until the time of formation of intermediate plains material.

This general conclusion seems to be supported in the Borealis region by the relative scarcity of craters between 30 km and 60 km in diameter. This scarcity may indicate resurfacing by crater overlap and blanketing by crater ejecta or resurfacing by lava flows. Craters ≥60 km in diameter on Mercury also are relatively scarce compared to similar craters in the lunar uplands northwest of crater Tsiolkovskiy. The reduced density of large craters and basins on Mercury relative to the Moon could be either a function of different crater-population rates on these bodies or an effect of different crustal histories (Schaber and others, 1977).

Intermediate plains material has a roughness and crater density transitional between intercrater plains material and smooth plains material. In the Borealis region, the unit occurs in a rather extensive belt that extends from the Shakespeare quadrangle into Borealis north and northeast of Suisei Planitia. Intermediate plains material was first recognized and mapped in the Tolstoj quadrangle (Schaber and McCauley, 1980), where it primarily occurs on the floors of craters. It was identified there by a lower crater density than that of intercrater plains material and by "a lower incidence of small bright-halo craters than are found on the smooth plains material" (Schaber and McCauley, 1980). Both characteristics are also typical of intermediate plains material in the Borealis region.

=== Basin materials ===
Goethe Basin is a large circular depression that measures approximately 400 km (250 mi) in diameter from rim crest to rim crest. Goethe is bounded on its north and east sides by a gently sloping wall and discontinuous, low, hummocky rim material that may consist of ejecta deposits. These materials are similar to those occurring around the Caloris Basin in the Tolstoj quadrangle (Schaber and McCauley, 1980). On its west side, Goethe is bounded by at least three subparallel ridges or tilted blocks, which are separated by narrow troughs partly filled with smooth plains material. Hilly and hummocky remnants resembling basin deposits and ejecta protrude above the gently sloping basin wall. They extend southwest and north of the basin beyond a much subdued, low, barely perceptible rim crest for a distance of one-half to one-third of the basin radius. Goethe is older than the smooth plains material by which its wall, rim crest, and most of its ejecta were partly buried. The Goethe impact basin may be older than some intercrater plains material and large craters nearby. It is also much older than the Caloris Basin. (McCauley and others, 1981).

Several additional impact structures within and to the south of the Borealis region display sufficient structural detail to be called basins, even though their diameters are less than the arbitrarily chosen 200 km lower limit adopted by Murray and others (1974) for mercurian basins. The largest and oldest of these is Botticelli, a crater 140 km (87 mi) in diameter centered at lat 64°N., long 110°W. Only the northernmost parts of the crater’s rim and interior lie within the mapped area, but the ghost remnant of an inner ring now flooded by smooth plains material is recognized (FDS 148) farther south in the Shakespeare quadrangle. Turgenev, 110 km (68 mi) in diameter, is large enough to be a central-peak basin (Wood and Head, 1976), even though the peak ring probably has been concealed under smooth plains material. The rims of both Botticelli and Turgenev are covered with densely packed craters, most of which resemble the secondary craters that typically occur on intercrater plains material. Therefore, Botticelli and Turgenev are at least as old as intercrater plains material and may be equivalent in age to the Goethe impact basin. A similar argument can be advanced for the age of the Monteverdi Basin, 130 km in diameter, centered at lat 64° N., long 77° W. in the Victoria quadrangle. The younger craters Jókai and Verdi, which have prominent central peaks and ghostlike discontinuous inner rings, probably qualify as central-peak basins (Wood and Head, 1976). Both structures are considerably younger than the Caloris Basin.

No material similar to either the lineated or the secondary-crater facies of the Van Eyck Formation, the most distinctive and distant unit of the Caloris Group (McCauley and others, 1981), can be unambiguously identified in the Borealis region. A few rounded hills or knobs, too small to be mapped, are present; they are morphologically similar to blocks of the Odin Formation surrounding the Caloris Basin in the Shakespeare quadrangle (Guest and Greeley, 1983), and to features of the Alpes Formation around the Imbrium Basin on the Moon. Two of the most striking of these knobs are possibly 2 km (1.2 mi) long and 0.2 km (0.12 mi) across; they rise above smooth plains material that fills a much degraded, unmapped, irregular crater at 69° N., 157° W. (FDS 088). These knobs are about 1,100 km (680 mi) northeast of Caloris Montes and may represent Caloris Basin ejecta. Alternatively, they may be associated with crater Verdi ejecta or with lineated and secondary-crater ejecta that flare southeastward from an unnamed crater north of and adjacent to the crater Nizami. Another morphologic feature that may be related to the Caloris Basin event consists of grooves on intercrater plains material and on the southwest-facing walls of craters such as Mansart. These grooves are as much as several kilometers long and several hundred meters wide. The direction of elongation of many small secondary craters also suggests an origin related to the Caloris event.

=== Younger plains material ===
Smooth plains material (unit ps) forms the vast expanses of Borealis and Suisei Planitiae, as well as most basin and crater floors. It is the most extensive stratigraphic unit in the Borealis region, covering 30 percent of the mapped area. The surface of the smooth plains material is rather sparsely cratered compared to that of the intercrater plains material. Wrinkle ridges are common. Both the floor of the Goethe Basin and the younger craters (now observed as buried craters) superposed on it are mantled by smooth plains material; the unit also fills ghost and flooded craters that are common on both Borealis and Suisei Planitiae and resemble the lunar crater Archimedes. The enormous volume of smooth plains material that must underlie Borealis Planitia in order to bury pre-existing topography, as well as the presence of the material in basin and crater floors, suggest that the smooth plains material was emplaced in a fluidized state as volcanic lava flows (Murray and others, 1974). Even though flow fronts cannot be unambiguously mapped on Borealis Planitia, further evidence of the unit's volcanic origin is supplied by its overlap onto intercrater plains material, best observed along the west edge of Borealis Planitia (FDS 85, 152, 153, 156, and 160). The various types of plains material recognized on Mercury exhibit little tonal contrast. The albedo of smooth plains material is higher than that of lunar mare material (Hapke and others, 1975). The similarity in albedo between mercurian smooth plains material and lunar light plains material led Wilhelms to extend the analogy to composition: he suggested that both units consist of impact ejecta similar to the lunar Cayley Formation sampled by Apollo 16. Wilhelms even hypothesized that the source basin for material of the extensive plains of Borealis Planitia "could well be lurking in the darkness beyond the terminator." A fuller discussion of the problem is given by Strom.

=== Crater materials ===
In the Borealis region, craters are mapped according to the fivefold classification proposed by McCauley and others (1981), which determines Mercurian crater ages on the basis of crater diameter and morphologic degradation. Craters less than about 30 km (19 mi) in diameter are not mapped. All basins between 100 km (62 mi) and 200 km (120 mi) in diameter (including those that have central peaks and peak rings) are mapped as craters. Criteria used to determine impact structures are morphologic crater components such as rays, secondary rays, hummocky rims, various facies of crater ejecta, crater geometry and structure, or a combination of these.

No rayed craters ≥ 30 km (19 mi) in diameter were observed in the mapped area, but many moderately bright and diffuse rays extend across smooth plains material or occur as halos around very small craters in Borealis Planitia. A train of northeast-trending discontinuous rays, which extends across Borealis Planitia as far as the Goethe Basin, may radiate from small unnamed and unmapped rayed craters near the south edge of the map area. The relative scarcity of small bright-halo craters on intermediate plains material, perhaps due to unique physical properties of this material, was first noted in the Tolstoj quadrangle (Schaber and McCauley, 1980); this scarcity is also characteristic of the unit in the Borealis region.

The reduced ballistic range on Mercury compared to the Moon is caused by Mercury's stronger gravitational field (McCauley and others, 1981). This phenomenon, which results in a reduced dispersion of ejecta and secondary craters, is best observed within the Borealis region around craters Verdi and Depréz. Slight differences between mercurian and lunar crater morphologies are unrelated to differences in the Mercurian and lunar gravitational fields (Cintala and others, 1977; Malin and Dzurisin, 1977, 1978;). Instead, the morphologic components of crater interiors and the abundance of central peaks and terraces on both bodies seem to be related to the physical properties of the target material (Cintala and others, 1977; Smith and Hartnell, 1978). The clusters of closely packed and overlapping large craters west of crater Gauguin and east of crater Mansart, together with nearby isolated craters and surrounding material, were mapped by Trask and Guest as heavily cratered terrain. According to them, many of the small craters superposed on the intercrater areas may be secondaries from the large craters. They also noted that the interiors of these large craters are filled with material that is less cratered, smoother, and therefore younger than the intercrater plains material.

Two types of ghost craters occur in the Borealis region; both are nearly obliterated by smooth plains material. In one type found along the northwest border of Suisei Planitia (Guest and Greeley, 1983), only the uppermost parts of walls and rims protrude above smooth plains material. Ghost craters of this type display rounded rim crests that are densely cratered with secondaries, a feature typical of the rough surface of intercrater plains material. These craters are floored by smooth plains material and are therefore older than it; a similar relation occurs on the Moon, where the crater Archimedes is seen to be older than the mare material it contains. Another type of ghost crater, common in Borealis Planitia, is recognized only by an irregular or thin outline of a rim crest under a thin mantle of smooth plains material; the buried rim crest is shown on the map. The polygonal ghost crater centered at lat 82.5° N., long 100° W., northwest of Depréz, is a transitional form between these two types. Polar darkening is generally lacking on Mercury (Hapke, 1977), but darkening in restricted areas may be due to vapor-phase deposition accompanying micrometeorite impacts (Hapke, 1977). In the Borealis region, surface darkening affects some crater floors, and low-albedo areas are mapped in both intermediate plains and smooth plains materials. The low-albedo plains are marginal to the borders of Borealis and Suisei Planitiae, which suggests that darkening may be due to internal volatile materials escaping along the fractured margins of unrecognized buried or very degraded basins.

== Structure ==
One of the major differences between the mercurian and lunar surfaces is "the widespread distribution [on Mercury] of lobate scarps which appear to be thrust or reverse faults resulting from a period of crustal compression..." These scarps are unique structural landforms that were noted soon after the acquisition of Mariner 10 photographs. Murray and others (1974) described them as having a sinuous outline, a slightly lobate front, and a length of more than 500 km. A more detailed description is given by Strom and others. Dzurisin (1978) classified these scarps, differentiating between intercrater and intracrater scarps (a scheme adopted in mapping the Borealis region) in an attempt to understand the tectonic and volcanic history of Mercury. Melosh (1977) and Melosh and Dzurisin (1978) proposed a planetary grid composed of conjugate northeastand northwest-trending shear fractures formed by the stresses of tidal despinning early in mercurian history. They thought that these fractures were later modified, and predicted that east-trending normal faults caused by tensional stresses would be found in the polar regions. In a later report, Pechmann and Melosh (1979, p. 243) stated that "the NE and NW trends become nearly N-S in the polar regions."

The northwest-trending component of the postulated global grid of fractures is markedly absent in the Borealis region. Northeast-trending scarps and troughs are conspicuous, however, across intercrater plains material and in crater fill (smooth plains material) between the 155° and 185° meridians, and from crater Van Dijck northward to crater Purcell and beyond. The scarps tend to be straight in intercrater plains material, but become notably lobate in crater fill (for example, within Saikaku). This set of northeast-trending scarps and troughs, and another set of north-trending scarps and troughs within and north of crater Van Dijck, probably follow zones of structural weakness in the mercurian crust. Ancient fractures that were reactivated by later impacts may have first provided the conduits for crater fill (smooth plains material) and later been propagated upward through the fill. That these ridges, scarps, and troughs are parts of a global grid of fractures cannot be stated conclusively because of their proximity to the terminator and the lack of photographic coverage beyond the 190° meridian. Some scarps probably were formed by normal faulting of the smooth plains material that covers some crater floors, as in the Kuiper quadrangle (Scott and others, 1980). We cannot, however, determine whether most lineaments are internal or are parts of a faulted and lineated facies associated with a nearby but unphotographed impact basin. Melosh (1977) predicted that normal east-trending faults would form in high Mercurian latitudes as a result of slight crustal shortening. His predicted faults may be represented by a generally east-northeast-trending scarp and a lineament that cut across intermediate plains material and the crater Jókai between the 125° and 155° meridians. The north pole is too close to the terminator to detect the presence or absence of a "polygonal arrangement without preferred orientation," as predicted by Melosh and Dzurisin (1978, p. 233).

Arcuate and radial lineaments that might result from tectonic adjustments of the Mercurian crust, following excavation of very large multiring impact basins such as the one postulated under Borealis Planitia (Boyce and Grolier, 1977), were not unambiguously identified in the Borealis region. On one hand, some ridges on the surface of the smooth plains material in Borealis Planitia may be of structural (internal) origin; this type of ridge elsewhere on Mercury has been ascribed to compression and a slight shortening of the crust (Melosh, 1977; Melosh and Dzurisin, 1978). On the other hand, the wrinklelike sinuous ridge along the northeast border of the Goethe Basin, together with the outward-facing concentric scarps along its periphery, may represent the fronts of lava flows that are associated with the development of a structural moat between the basin fill and the wall. The latter interpretation supports the view that impact craters and basins on Mercury, as on the Moon (Schultz, 1977) and Mars, "have played a dominant role in controlling the surface expression of igneous activity" (Schultz and Glicken, 1979, p. 8033). Slow, long-lasting isostatic adjustment of the basin floor may have continued well after the emplacement of the basin fill, a structural situation similar to that of crater Posidonius on the Moon (Schaber and others, 1977, Schultz, 1977).

In Borealis Planitia, however, most of the ridges are of external origin. They appear either to outline the rim crests of subjacent ghost craters that are lightly mantled by smooth plains material or to be lava flow fronts. The map shows the rim crests of 20 ghost craters, ranging in diameter from 40 to 160 km, that are buried under the smooth plains material of Borealis Planitia, which material is coextensive with the fill covering the floor of the Goethe Basin. In addition, ejecta from the crater Depréz extend more than 40 km eastward beyond a circular scarp that may represent the rim crest of a buried crater 170 km in diameter (FDS 156, 160) or, more likely, the front of lava flows. The size and density of these ghost craters suggest that, prior to emplacement of smooth plains material, the original heavily cratered surface of Borealis Planitia—which may have been the cratered floor of a very large multiring impact basin—and the cratered floor of the Goethe Basin were similar in composition and age to the intercrater plains material of the highlands to the west. Many scarps in Borealis Planitia are subconcentric to the rim of the Goethe Basin and have steeper slopes that face away from it, suggesting that they represent the fronts of lava flows that resurfaced extensive areas of heavily cratered terrain (intercrater or older plains material).

== Geologic history ==
Five periods were postulated by Murray and others (1975) to constitute the history of Mercury’s surface: (1) accretion and differentiation; (2) terminal bombardment; (3) formation of the Caloris Basin; (4) flooding of that basin and other areas; and (5) light cratering on the smooth plains. Only the periods following accretion are directly interpretable within the Borealis region.

Intercrater plains material, which may be a reworked and mixed aggregate of impact and volcanic deposits, was emplaced over a long period that extended past the creation of the Goethe Basin and many smaller basins and craters. The scarps and troughs that trend across intercrater plains material may indicate an early compressional episode that followed even earlier expansion and differentiation of the crust. The size and density of ghost craters that are detectable under the smooth plains material in the interior of the Goethe Basin are indicative of an original basin floor much modified by cratering and emplacement of intercrater materials prior to the emplacement of intermediate and smooth plains materials. This interpretation implies, therefore, that the formation of the Goethe Basin predated or occurred soon after the emplacement of intercrater plains material had begun. The relative similarity in albedo of the Mercurian plains, whether formed of intercrater, intermediate, or smooth plains materials, also suggests a similarity in chemical composition and possibly in mode of emplacement of plains materials. The high crater density of intercrater and intermediate plains materials makes it likely, however, that the original rock types of these two units (whether basalt, impact melt, or impact breccia) were modified considerably by further brecciation following emplacement.

Goethe Basin is considerably older than the Caloris Basin. Emplacement of the smooth plains material of Borealis Planitia during several or many episodes resulted in resurfacing and smoothing of the original material of the Goethe Basin and its surroundings for hundreds of kilometers.

The mercurian surface reached its present configuration several billion years ago (Solomon, 1978). It has been only slightly altered since by impact craters, which are ubiquitously superposed on all other deposits. Generalized summaries of the history of Mercury have been given by Guest and O’Donnell (1977), Davies and others, and Strom.

== Sources ==
- Grolier, Maurice J.; Joseph M. Boyce (1984). "Geologic Map of the Borealis Region (H-1) of Mercury" (PDF). Prepared for the National Aeronautics and Space Administration by the U.S. Department of the Interior, U.S. Geological Survey (Published in hardcopy as USGS Miscellaneous Investigations Series Map I–1660, as part of the Atlas of Mercury, 1:5,000,000 Geologic Series. Hardcopy is available for sale from U.S. Geological Survey, Information Services, Box 25286, Federal Center, Denver, CO 80225)

== Bibliography ==
- Boyce, J. M., Dial, A. L., and Masursky, Harold, 1976, The optimal sun angle for obtaining photographs of martian surface features from orbit: U.S. Geological Survey Interagency Report: Astrogeology 78, 8 p.
- Boyce, J. M., and Grolier, M. J., 1977, The geology of the Goethe (H-l) quadrangle of Mercury, in Arvidson, Raymond, and Wahmann, Russell, eds., Reports of planetary geology program, 1976–1977: National Aeronautics and Space Administration Technical Memorandum X-3511, p. 237.
- Cintala, M. J., Wood, C. A., and Head, J. W., 1977, The effects of target characteristics on fresh crater morphology: Preliminary results for the moon and Mercury: Lunar Science Conference, 8th, Houston, 1977, Proceedings, p. 3409–3425, 4 figs., 3 tables.
- Colombo, Giuseppe, 1965, Rotational period of the planet Mercury: Nature, v. 208, no. 5010, p. 575.
- Colombo, Giuseppe, and Shapiro, I. I., 1966, The rotation of the planet Mercury: The Astrophysical Journal, v. 145, p. 296–307.
- De Hon, R. A., Scott, D. H., and Underwood, J. R., Jr., 1981, Geologic map of the Kuiper quadrangle of Mercury; U.S. Geological Survey Miscellaneous Investigations Series Map I-1233, scale 1:5,000,000.
- Dzurisin, Daniel, 1978, The tectonic and volcanic history of Mercury as inferred from studies of scarps, ridges, troughs, and other lineaments: Journal of Geophysical Research, v. 83, no. B10, p. 4883–4906.
- Guest, J. E., and Greeley, Ronald, 1983, Geologic map of the Shakespeare quadrangle of Mercury: U.S. Geological Survey Miscellaneous Investigations Series Map I-1408, scale 1:5,000,000.
- Guest, J. E., and O’Donnell, W. P., 1977, Surface history of Mercury: A review: Vistas in Astronomy, v. 20, p. 273–300.
- Hapke, Bruce, 1977, Interpretations of optical observations of Mercury and the Moon: Physics of the Earth and Planetary Interiors, v. 15, p. 264– 274.
- Hapke, Bruce, Danielson, G. E., Jr., Klaasen, Kenneth, and Wilson, Lionel, 1975, Photometric observations of Mercury from Mariner 10: Journal of Geophysical Research, v. 80, no. 17, p. 2431–2443
- Hartmann, W. K., 1966, Early lunar cratering: Icarus, v. 5, no.4, p. 406– 418.
- Hartmann, W. K., 1967, Lunar crater counts, III: Post mare and “Archimedean” variations: Lunar and Planetary Laboratory, Communication no. 116, v. 7, pt. 3, p. 125–129.
- Klaasen, K. P., 1976, Mercury’s rotation axis and period: Icarus, v. 28, no. 4, p. 469–478.
- Malin, M. C., and Dzurisin, Daniel, 1977, Landform degradation on Mercury, the Moon, and Mars: Evidence from crater depth/diameter relationships: Journal of Geophysical Research, v. 82, no. 2, p. 376– 388, 7 figs., 7 tables.
- Malin, M. C., and Dzurisin, Daniel, 1978, Modification of fresh crater landforms: Evidence from the Moon and Mercury: Journal of Geophysical Research, v. 83, no. Bl, p. 233–243.
- Masursky, Harold, Colton, G. W., and El-Baz, Farouk, eds., 1978, Apollo over the Moon: A view from orbit: National Aeronautics and Space Administration Special Publication 362, 255 p.
- McCauley, J. F., Guest, J. E., Schaber, G. G., Trask, N. J., and Greeley, Ronald, 1981, Stratigraphy of the Caloris Basin, Mercury: Icarus, v. 47, no. 2, p. 184–202.
- McGill, G. E., and King, E. A., 1983, Geologic map of the Victoria quadrangle of Mercury: U.S. Geological Survey Miscellaneous Investigations Series Map I-1409, scale 1:5,000,000.
- Melosh, H. J., 1977, Global tectonics of a despun planet: Icarus, v. 31, no. 2, p. 221–243.
- Melosh, H. J., and Dzurisin, Daniel, 1978, Mercurian global tectonics: A consequence of tidal despining?: Icarus, v. 35, no. 2, p. 227–236.
- Murray, B. C., Belton, J. J. S., Danielson, G. E., Davies, M. E., Gault, D. E., Hapke, Bruce, O’Leary, Brian, Strom, R. G., Suomi, Verner, and Trask, Newell, 1974, Mercury’s surface: Preliminary deseription and interpretation from Mariner 10 pictures: Science, v. 185, no. 4146, p. 169–179.
- Murray, B. C., Malin, M. C., and Greeley, Ronald, 1981, Earthlike planets: San Francisco, W. H. Freeman and Co., 387p.
- Murray, B. C., Strom, R. G., Trask, N. J., and Gault, D. E., 1975, Surface history of Mercury: Implications for terrestrial planets: Journal of Geophysical Research, v. 80, no. 17, p. 2508–2514.
- Pechmann, J. B., and Melosh, H. J., 1979 Global fracture patterns of a despun planet: Application to Mercury: Icarus, v. 38, no. 2, p. 243–250.
- Schaber. G. G., Boyce, J. M., Trask, N.J., 1977, Moon-Mercury: Large impact structures, isostacy, an average crustal viscosity: Physics of the Earth and Planetary Interiors, v. 15, nos. 2–3, p. 189–201.
- Schaber, G. G., and McCauley, J. F., 1980, Geologic map of the Tolstoj quadrangle of Mercury: U.S. Geological Survey Miscellaneous Investigations Series Map I-1199, scale 1:5,000,000.
- Schultz, P. H., 1977, Endogenic modification of impact craters on Mercury: Physics of the Earth and Planetary Interiors, v. 15, nos. 2–3, p. 202–219.
- Schultz, P. H., and Gicken, Harry, 1979, Impact crater and basin control of igneous processes on Mars: Journal of Geophysical Research, v. 84, no. B14, p. 8033–8047.
- Scott, D. H., 1972, Geologic map of the Maurolycus quadrangle of the Moon: U.S. Geological Survey Miscellaneous Investigations Map I-695, scale 1:1,000,000.
- Scott, D. H., Underwood, J. R., Jr., and De Hon, R. A., 1980, Normal faults on Mercury: Example in the Kuiper quadrangle, in Reports of planetary programs, 1979–1980: National Aeronautics and Space Administration Technical Memorandum 81776, p. 28–30.
- Smith, E. I., and Hartnell, J. A., 1978, Crater-size-shape profiles for the Moon and Mercury: Terrain effects and interplanetary comparisons: The Moon and the Planets, v. 19, p. 479–511, 17 figs., 3 tables, appendices.
- Soderblom, L. A., and Boyce, J. M., 1972, Relative age of some near-side and far-side terra plains based on Apollo 16 metric photography: Apollo 16 Preliminary Report: National Aeronautics and Space Administration Special Publication 315, p. 29.3–29.6.
- Solomon, S. C., 1978, On volcanism and thermal tectonics on one-plate planets: Geophysical Research Letters, v. 5, no. 6, p. 461–464, 3 figs.
- Strom, R. G., 1977, Origin and relative age of lunar and mercurian intercrater plains: Physics of the Earth and Planetary Interiors, v. 15, nos. 2–3, p. 156–172.
- Stuart-Alexander, D. E., and Wilhelms, D. E., 1975, The Nectarian System: A new lunar time-stratigraphic unit: U.S. Geological Survey Journal of Research, v. 3, no. 1, p. 53–58.
- Wilhelms, D. E., and El-Baz, Farouk, 1977, Geologic map of the east side of the Moon: U.S. Geological Survey Miscellaneous Investigations Series Map I-948, scale 1:5,000,000.
- Wilhelms, D. E., and McCauley, J. F., 1971, Geologic map of the near side of the Moon: U.S. Geological Survey Miscellaneous Geologic Investigations Map I-1703, scale 1:5,000,000.
- Wood, C. A., and Head, J. W., 1976, Comparison of impact basins on Mercury, Mars and the Moon: Lunar Science Conference, 7th, Houston, 1977, Proeedings, p. 3629–3651.
- Wood, J. A., Dickey, J. S., Marvin, U. B., and Powell, B. N., 1970, Lunar anorthosites and a geophysical model of the Moon: Apollo 11 Lunar Science Conference, Houston, 1970, Proceedings, v. 1, p. 965– 988.

H-1 Borealis (features)
H-5 Hokusai (features)	H-4 Raditladi (features)	H-3 Shakespeare (features)		H-2 Victoria (features)
H-10 Derain (features)	H-9 Eminescu (features)	H-8 Tolstoj (features)	H-7 Beethoven (features)	H-6 Kuiper (features)
H-14 Debussy (features)	H-13 Neruda (features)	H-12 Michelangelo (features)		H-11 Discovery (features)
H-15 Bach (features)
