= Janáček (crater) =

Crater on Mercury

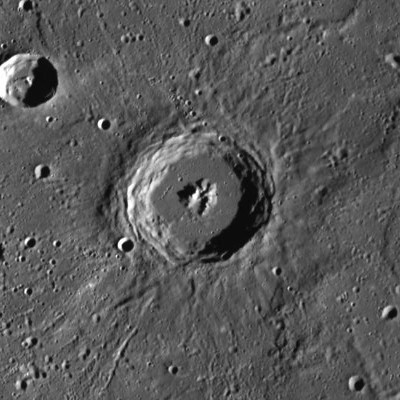
- MESSENGER WAC mosaic of Janáček
- Feature type: Central-peak impact crater
- Location: Shakespeare quadrangle, Mercury
- Coordinates: 55.72°N 154.85°W
- Diameter: 47 km
- Eponym: Leoš Janáček

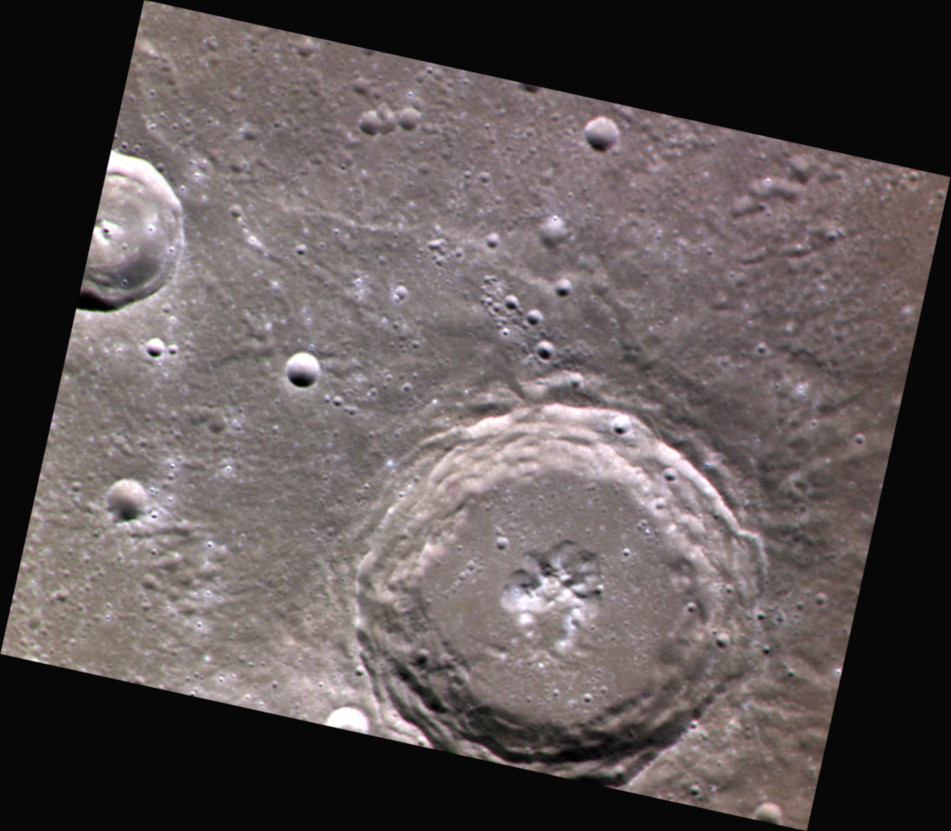
Approximate color image of Janáček

Janáček is a crater on Mercury. It has a diameter of 47 kilometers. Its name was adopted by the International Astronomical Union (IAU) in 1985. Janáček is named for the Czech composer Leoš Janáček, who lived from 1854 to 1928. The MESSENGER Mercury orbiter crashed near the crater on 30 April 2015.
