= Shakespeare (Mercurian crater) =

Crater on Mercury

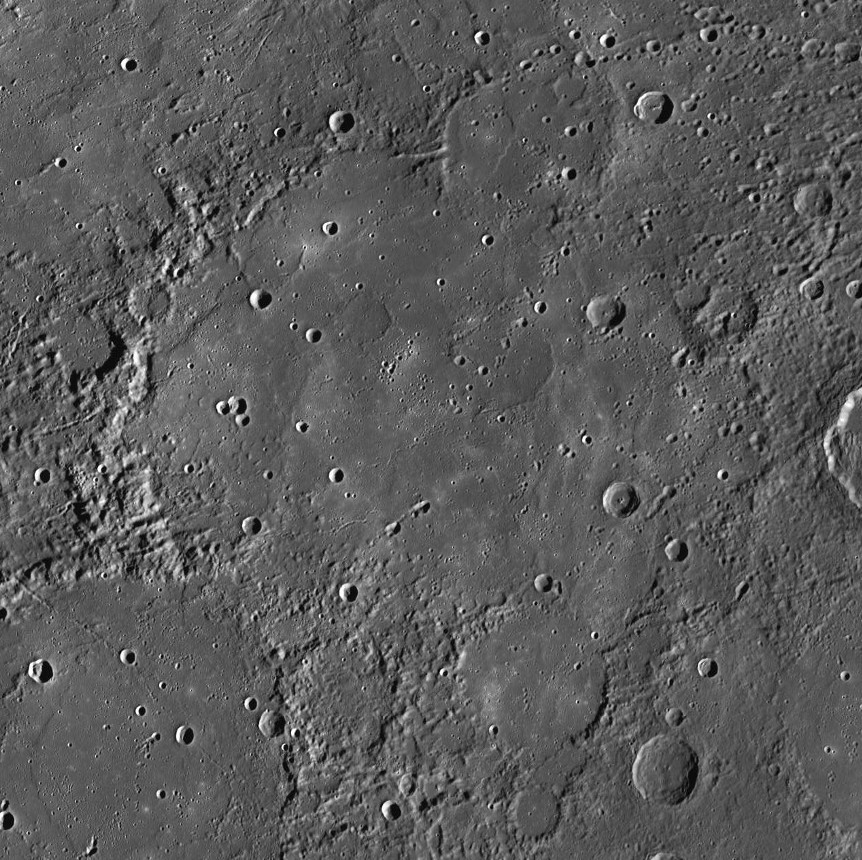
- MESSENGER WAC mosaic
- Feature type: Impact crater
- Location: Shakespeare quadrangle, Mercury
- Coordinates: 48.10°N 152.25°W
- Diameter: 399 km (248 mi)
- Eponym: William Shakespeare

Shakespeare is an impact basin in the Shakespeare quadrangle of Mercury, which is named after this crater. It was named after playwright William Shakespeare in 1979. The crater was first imaged by Mariner 10 in 1974.
