= Saikaku (crater) =

Crater on Mercury

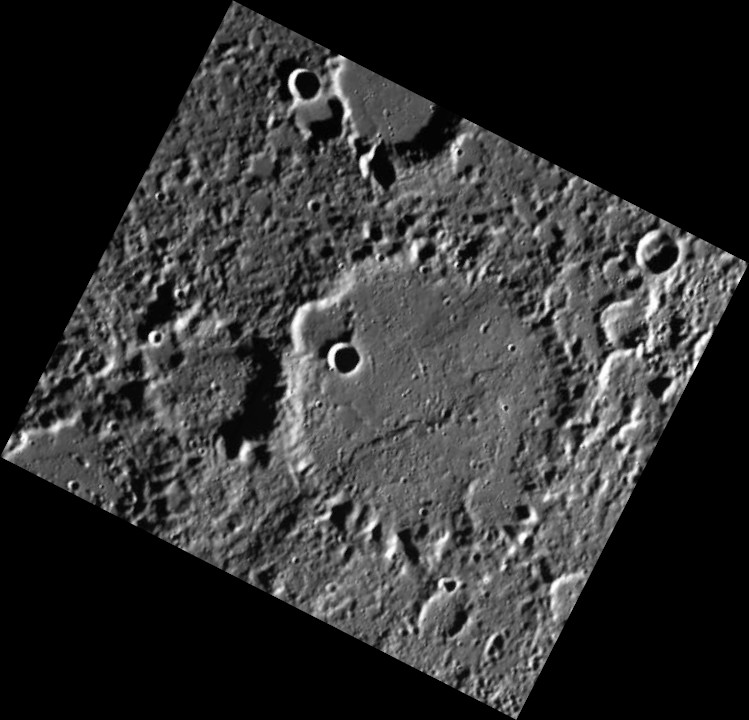
- MESSENGER WAC
- Planet: Mercury
- Coordinates: 71.96°N 177.97°W
- Quadrangle: Borealis
- Diameter: 64.0 km (39.8 mi)
- Eponym: Ihara Saikaku

Saikaku is a crater on Mercury. Its name was adopted by the International Astronomical Union (IAU) in 1979. The crater is named for Japanese poet Ihara Saikaku.

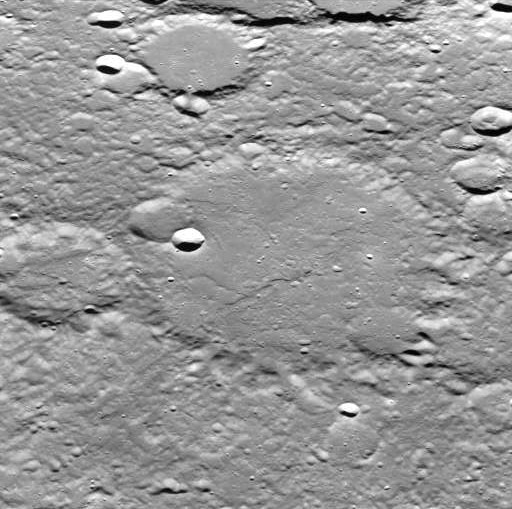
Oblique view
