= Suisei Planitia =

Planitia on Mercury

- Location: Shakespeare quadrangle, Mercury
- Coordinates: 59.2°N 150.8°W
- Eponym: Japanese name for Mercury

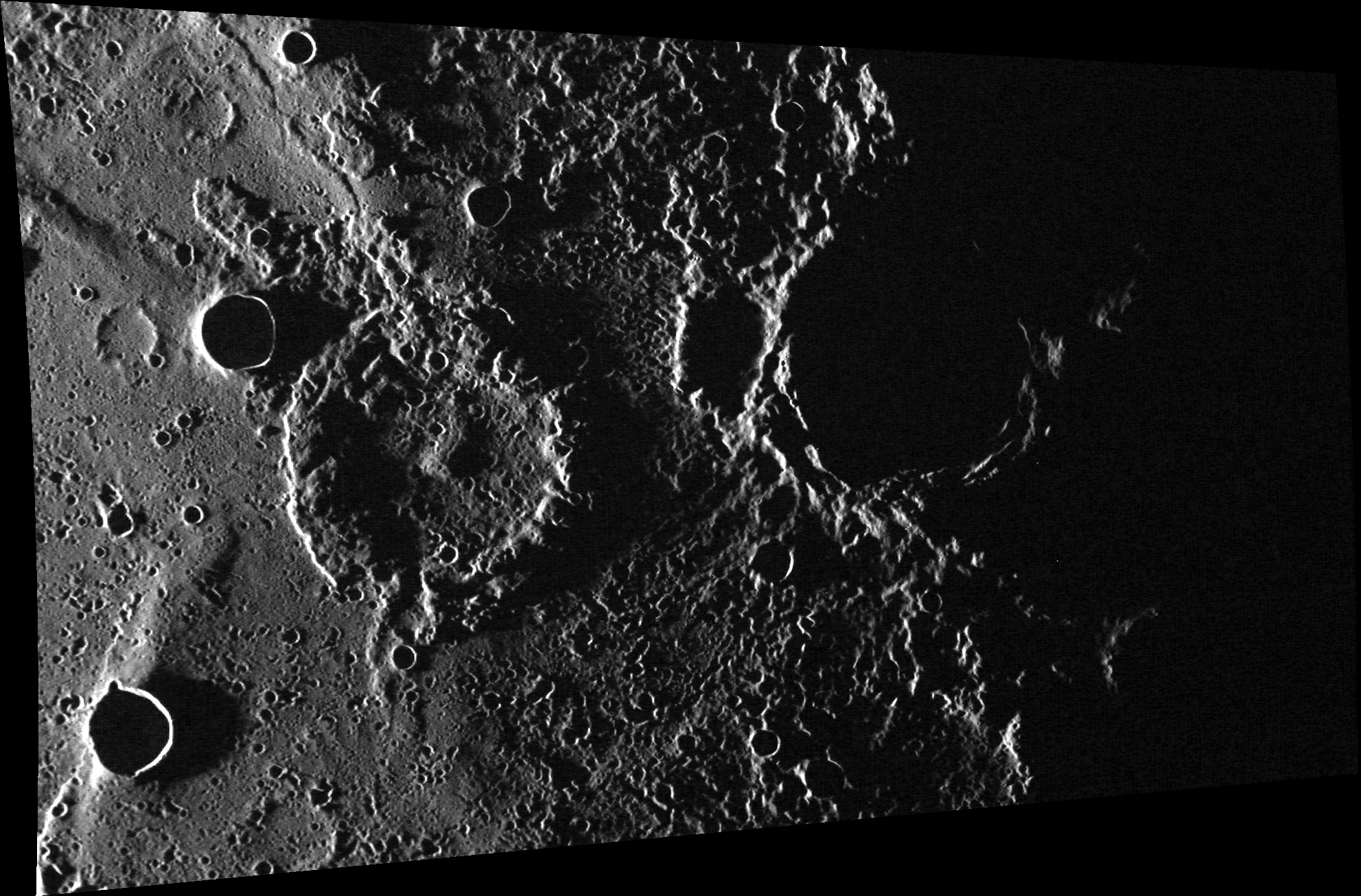
Ghost crater at terminator in northern Suisei Planitia

Suisei Planitia is a large area of smooth plains on Mercury, approximately 570 km wide. Ghost craters are unusual forms that occur in the Suisei Planitia. They are buried and rounded in profile, with only their rim crests rising above the surrounding smooth plains. It has been suggested that material forming Suisei Planitia is ejecta from the impact that formed Caloris Planitia. The name for this Planitia was approved in 1976 by the IAU.

The MESSENGER Mercury orbiter crashed into the southern part of the plain on 30 April 2015, east of the crater Janáček.
