= List of quadrangles on Mercury =

The surface of the planet Mercury has been divided into fifteen quadrangles, designated H-1 to H-15 (the 'H' stands for Hermes, the Greek equivalent of Mercury). The quadrangles are named for prominent surface features visible within each area. The quadrangles were initially named for albedo features, as these were the most prominent features visible before mapping was carried out by spacecraft. The mapping carried out with the images obtained by the Mariner 10 flybys in 1974 and 1975 led to nine of the quadrangles being renamed for newly mapped prominent features. The remaining six quadrangles were completely unmapped by Mariner 10 and were still referred to by their albedo feature names. Following the arrival of MESSENGER in orbit in 2011, these six quadrangles were mapped and renamed. The base mosaic used in the new maps was produced with orbital images by the MESSENGER Team and released by NASA's Planetary Data System on March 8, 2013. This global mosaic includes complete coverage of Mercury's surface.

Name	Number	Namesake	Albedo feature name	Latitudes	Longitudes	Mariner 10 map	Current map	Notes
Borealis	H-1	Borealis Planitia	Borea	67-90° N	0-360°			Provisionally called "Goethe", but renamed by the International Astronomical Union in 1976 (IAU, 1977)
Victoria	H-2	Victoria Rupes	Aurora	21-66° N	0-90°			
Shakespeare	H-3	Shakespeare crater	Caduceata	21-66° N	90-180°			
Raditladi	H-4	Raditladi crater	Liguria	21-66° N	180-270°	none		
Hokusai	H-5	Hokusai crater	Apollonia	21-66° N	270-360°	none		
Kuiper	H-6	Kuiper crater	Tricrena	22°S - 22°N	0-72°			
Beethoven	H-7	Beethoven crater	Solitudo Lycaonis	22°S - 22°N	72-144°			
Tolstoj	H-8	Tolstoj crater	Phaethontias	22°S - 22°N	144-216°			Provisionally called "Tir", but renamed by the International Astronomical Union in 1976 (IAU, 1977)
Eminescu	H-9	Eminescu crater	Solitudo Criophori	22°S - 22°N	216-288°	none		
Derain	H-10	Derain crater	Pieria	22°S - 22°N	288-360°	none		
Discovery	H-11	Discovery Rupes	Solitudo Hermae Trismegisti	21-66° S	0-90°			
Michelangelo	H-12	Michelangelo crater	Solitudo Promethei	21-66° S	90-180°			
Neruda	H-13	Neruda crater	Solitudo Persephones	21-66° S	180-270°	none		
Debussy	H-14	Debussy crater	Cyllene	21-66° S	270-360°	none		
Bach	H-15	Bach crater	Australia	67-90° S	0-360°			

== Schema of the quadrangles ==
Relationship of the quadrangles to each other on the surface of Mercury:

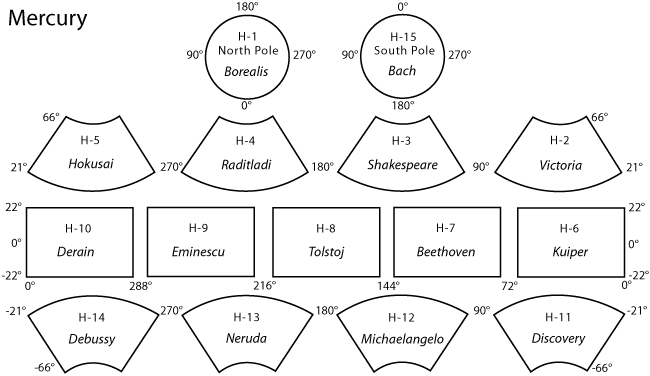

== See also ==
- List of quadrangles on Venus
- List of quadrangles on the Moon
- List of quadrangles on Mars

H-1 Borealis (features)
H-5 Hokusai (features)	H-4 Raditladi (features)	H-3 Shakespeare (features)		H-2 Victoria (features)
H-10 Derain (features)	H-9 Eminescu (features)	H-8 Tolstoj (features)	H-7 Beethoven (features)	H-6 Kuiper (features)
H-14 Debussy (features)	H-13 Neruda (features)	H-12 Michelangelo (features)		H-11 Discovery (features)
H-15 Bach (features)
