= Shakespeare quadrangle =

Quadrangle on Mercury

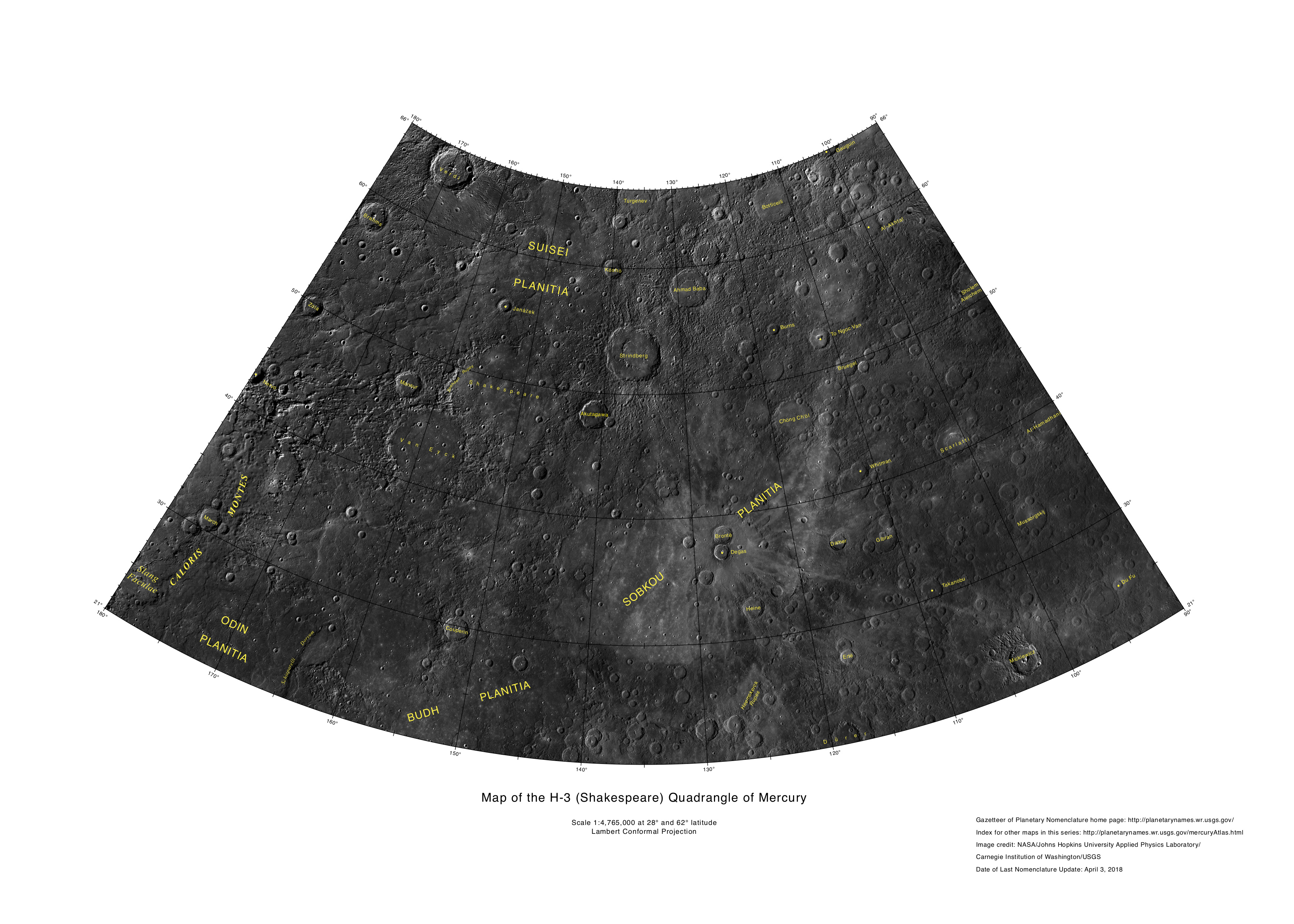
Shakespeare quadrangle as mapped by the MESSENGER spacecraft

The Shakespeare quadrangle is a region of Mercury running from 90 to 180° longitude and 20 to 70° latitude. It is also called Caduceata.

The Borealis quadrangle is north of Shakespeare quadrangle. To the west is Raditladi quadrangle, and to the east is Victoria quadrangle. To the southwest is Tolstoj quadrangle, and to the southeast is Beethoven quadrangle.

== Mariner 10 imaging ==
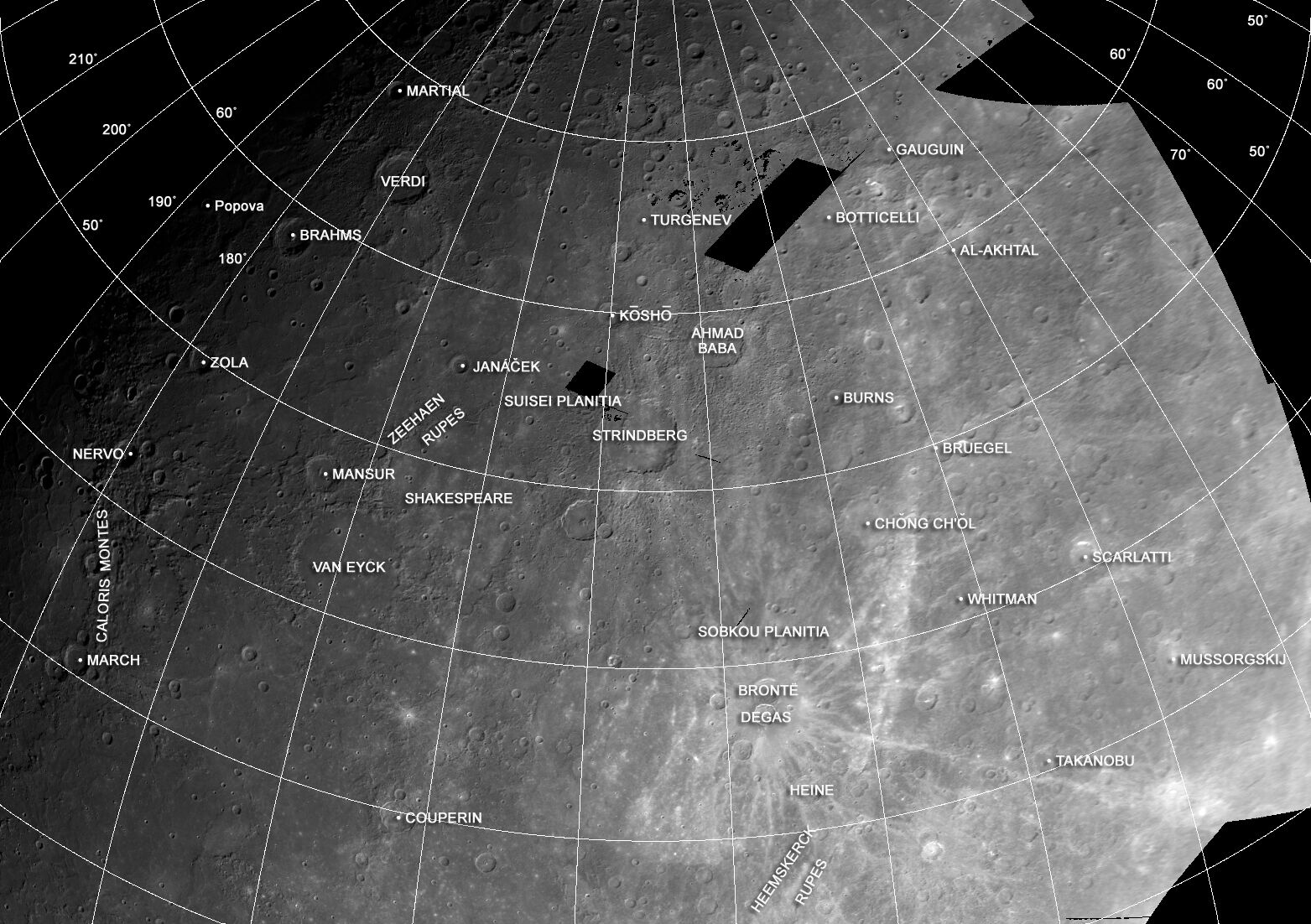
Mariner 10 photomosaic

Prior to the images taken by MESSENGER, the only spacecraft images of Mercury were those taken by the Mariner 10 spacecraft, which made three passes of the planet in 1974–75 (Murray and others, 1974a,b; Strom and others, 1975a). Most images used in mapping the geology of the Shakespeare quadrangle were taken during the near-equatorial first pass, with close encounter or the dark side of the planet. The second, south-polar pass did not image the Shakespeare quadrangle at high resolution. High-resolution images of small areas within the quadrangle were also obtained during the third pass, when the spacecraft was on a near-encounter north-polar trajectory. Because the spacecraft viewed the same areas from different positions during the first and second passes, stereoscopic pictures are available for certain areas of the southern hemisphere; however, such pictures are not available for the Shakespeare quadrangle. All of the Mariner 10 passes occurred under similar lighting conditions. Across the Shakespeare quadrangle, these conditions varied from low light at the terminator near the west boundary to higher sun at the east boundary. Consequently, lighting conditions were favorable for determining fine-scale relief in the west, but progressively less so toward the east. Conversely, albedo features such as bright crater rays, which are conspicuous in the eastern part, become increasingly difficult to recognize westward toward the terminator. This range of lighting conditions across the quadrangle results in inconsistent geologic mapping, because topography, albedo, and surface texture are critical for characterizing individual materials units. The average resolution of the pictures used from the first pass is just over 1 km.

== MESSENGER images ==
The MESSENGER spacecraft mapped all of Mercury's quadrangles at much greater detail than that of Mariner 10. For example, the fresh crater Degas was imaged at very high resolution, and the possible volcanic vents within To Ngoc Van, Scarlatti, and Gibran craters were imaged.

== Regional setting ==
The dominant feature in the Shakespeare quadrangle is the Caloris Basin, 1,300 km in diameter. This impact basin is the largest and best preserved on the hemisphere of Mercury observed by Mariner 10. Almost the entire eastern half of the basin is in the Raditladi quadrangle; the west half was in the nightside hemisphere of Mercury during all the Mariner 10 passes, and part of the southern half lies in the adjacent Tolstoj quadrangle (Schaber and McCauley, 1980). Surrounding Caloris is a discontinuous annulus of its ejecta deposits, called the Caloris Group. Caloris ejecta are embayed and partly covered by a plains unit that lies mostly in large, roughly circular depressions, some of which may be ancient degraded basins. This plains material also occurs in the floors of old craters and in small irregular topographic lows.

The eastern part of the Shakespeare quadrangle consists mainly of cratered terrain and intercrater plains. Over the whole of the mapped area are scattered fresh craters superposed on other units; in the eastern part the large fresh craters show well- developed bright rays.

== Stratigraphy ==
=== Pre-Caloris materials ===
The oldest recognizable unit in the quadrangle is the intercrater plains material. These plains were originally described by Trask and Guest as intercrater plains. The unit has a surface expression of rolling to hummocky plains in the areas between large craters and is exposed mainly in the eastern part of the mapped area. The surface of the unit is pockmarked with craters, many of which are small (about 5 to 10 km in diameter), elliptical, and shallow; they are inferred from their shape to be secondary craters associated with larger craters and basins. Trask and Guest concluded that the surface of these plains represents a primordial surface of Mercury on which craters have been superposed. The large extent of this surface compared to its counterpart on the Moon was thought to reflect the restricted distribution of ejecta around each individual crater caused by the relatively high gravity on Mercury. Because of this high gravity, considerable areas were unaffected by crater and basin ejecta. However, Malin and Guest and O'Donnell (1977) have shown that in some areas the intercrater plains overlie highly degraded craters, a relation suggesting either that the intercrater plains were formed during a specific time in Mercury's history and that cratering occurred both before and after their emplacement, or, alternatively, that the intercrater plains were formed by a continuous process throughout cratering history.

In several parts of the quadrangle, especially on the margins of large expanses of smooth plains materials, is a unit of smoother and less rolling plains that have a lower crater density. Following Schaber and McCauley (1980), this unit is called intermediate plains material. It is difficult to map with precision because it grades into both the intercrater plains and the smooth plains. Also, its recognition depends on lighting conditions that vary across the mapped areas, especially east of longitude 120°. The presence of this unit suggests that the plains-forming process spanned much of the early geologic history of Mercury and continued long after the peak of cratering. In the southern part of Sobkou Planitia, intermediate plains have a lower albedo than the adjacent plains. In some places, they may simply represent areas of intercrater plains that have been partly flooded by the younger smooth plains material.

Lineated plains material was recognized by Trask and Guest as forming terrain consisting of lines of hills and valleys, some of which are as much as 300 km long. This unit modified older large craters and intercrater plains. Its features are similar to those of the lunar Imbrium sculpture (Gilbert 1893) and to the hills and valleys radial to the Nectaris Basin on the Moon (Stuart-Alexander, 1971). The lineations were probably formed in a similar way to those of the Imbrium sculpture, which resulted from excavation by projectiles ejected at low angles from the Imbrium Basin; however, some of the mercurian valleys may be the result of faulting. Most of the lineated material in the Shakespeare quadrangle appears to be subradial to an ancient basin lying between Odin Planitia and Budh Planitia centered at latitude 28° N., longitude 158° W. However, except for its northernmost exposure, the surface of this unit is mantled by a facies of the Odin Formation.

Hilly plains material consists of low, rounded, closely spaced hills with relatively few superposed craters. The hills range in size from 1 to 2 km across and were estimated to have heights of 100 to 200 m by Trask and Guest, who first recognized this unit and named it hilly terrain. The main tracts of hilly material occur in a roughly concentric band outside the Caloris ejecta. It is possible that this unit is associated with Caloris, although apart from geographical distribution, there is no supporting evidence. In some places, contact relations suggest that the hilly plains material may be older than intermediate plains material. Also, patches of the hilly material may be associated with intercrater plains materials in the eastern part of the quadrangle, where lighting conditions do not allow its recognition.

=== Caloris group ===
Rock units associated with the Caloris Basin are particularly important for the stratigraphy of Mercury. It has been demonstrated that the history of the Moon was punctuated by a series of major impacts that have emplaced ejecta over widespread areas; the rock units associated with these impact basins were used to divide the lunar stratigraphic column into a series of well-defined time units (Shoemaker and Hackman, 1962; McCauley, 1967; Wilhelms, 1972). These relations are particularly clear for the Imbrium Basin (Wilhelms and McCauley, 1971) and Orientale Basin (Scott and others, 1977).

Recognizable ejecta units extend outward from the Caloris Basin as far as one basin diameter; these units can be used to divide the mercurian stratigraphic column in much the same way as basin ejecta were used on the Moon. A stratigraphic and structural comparison between the Caloris and Orientale Basins has been made by McCauley (1977).

In the Shakespeare quadrangle, only a lineated facies of the Van Eyck Formation is recognized, whereas in the Tolstoj quadrangle to the south, both it and a secondary crater facies are mapped (Schaber and McCauley, 1980; McCauley and others, 1981).

=== Post-Caloris materials ===
The plains material that forms the floor of the Caloris Basin has not been included in the Caloris Group and is mapped separately from the smooth plains. In many way, the Caloris-floor plains are similar to the smooth plains, except that they have been buckled and fractured into numerous ridges and grooves that intersect to form a grossly polygonal pattern. The dominant trends of these features are concentric and radial to the center of Caloris. On the basis of photometric evidence, Hapke and others (1975) suggested that the central part of the basin floor may be 7±3 km lower than the outer edge. Strom and others argued that the ridges were formed by compressive stress generated by subsidence of the floor, and the fractures by subsequent uplift of the center of the basin to produce crustal lengthening and the observed fracture pattern. The origin of the material itself is doubtful. It may consist of sheets of volcanic material emplaced shortly after the basin was formed or it may be material formed by the Caloris event either as melt or as the upper part of a plug of plastic material that rose in the crater floor as part of the impact process. Whatever the origin of this material, it seems clear that it covers the original floor of the excavated crater.

The smooth plains material forms essentially level tracts, flooring depressions in the mercurian surface. The most extensive of such areas in this quadrangle are Sobkou and Budh Planitiae. The surface of the smooth plains material is relatively sparsely cratered, and overlap relations indicate that these plains units are younger than the intercrater plains and intermediate plains. Smooth plains also embay units of the Caloris Group. Smaller patches of smooth plains occur in depressions and old crater floors. In many areas, especially those closer to the Caloris Basin, they exhibit mare ridges like those on the Moon and thus have a rolling appearance. The boundary between smooth plains and the Odin Formation is not everywhere clear, except at high resolution. Smooth plains are mapped in the Shakespeare quadrangle only where there is no clear evidence of small hills characteristic of the Odin Formation.

Interpretation of the origin of the smooth plains is difficult but significant, because it bears directly on the internal constitution and thermal history of Mercury. Like the lunar maria, the smooth plains occur on the floors of large craters and basins, and the broad swath of plains around Caloris finds an analogy with Oceanus Procellarum around Imbrium on the Moon. However, the Caloris plains differ from the maria in having no observed positive-relief volcanic features such as those sparsely scattered on the lunar maria. The absence of sharp albedo differences between the smooth plains and the older terrain (Hapke and others, 1975), compared with the distinct difference in albedo between the lunar maria and highlands, may be more indicative of composition than of origin of the rocks. On the basis of distribution and volume, Strom and others argued that in most areas the smooth plains consist of extensive sheets of basic lava similar to the lunar maria. Schultz (1977), studying modified impact craters, also argued in favor of volcanism. On the other hand, Wilhelms pointed out that the lunar light plains could also serve as an analog of the mercurian smooth plains: Apollo 16 samples indicate that lunar light plains consist of cataclastic breccia and impact melt, interpreted as being emplaced by large impact events (James, 1977). Wilhelms, therefore, proposed that the smooth plains on Mercury may be related to the Caloris impact directly, as breccias and impact melts, rather than as lavas. However, the light plains on the Moon are nowhere so well developed or extensive as the plains around Caloris, and if Wilhelms' explanation is correct, considerable differences must exist between large impact events on the Moon and Mercury. Most likely, large parts of the smooth plains are of volcanic origin, although in some areas they may be of impact-melt origin.

The very smooth plains on Mercury were included in the smooth plains unit by Trask and Guest. Here the geologic units are mapped separately, because very smooth plains material is clearly younger than smooth plains material. The very smooth plains unit, which is featureless and has no resolvable superposed craters, is possibly ejecta fallback on the floors of craters. However, not all craters contain this material; some are floored by material with a rugged surface mapped as crater floor material, because it is analogous to the floor material in younger lunar craters such as Copernicus or Aristarchus. One other possibility is that the very smooth plains are volcanic.

=== Crater materials ===
The craters on Mercury show various states of preservation, ranging from crisp-featured craters with bright rays to those that are almost totally obliterated and consist only of a subdued ring of heavily cratered hills. As on the Moon, the principal eroding process is likely impact; thus, a fresh crater will be degraded systematically over time. Craters of similar size that show similar states of preservation are therefore considered to be of about the same age. Craters are mapped according to a fivefold classification on the basis of their states of degradation (McCauley and others, 1981). The components used to define the crater ages are rays, secondary craters, ejecta facies, central peaks and rings, rim form, and inner terraces. As a crater ages, the number of superposed craters increases and each of the morphologic elements becomes more subdued. Volcanic activity also may bury or destroy certain crater components, but the crater may still be dated by the preservation of the remaining rim. On the basis of mapping in this quadrangle and in the adjacent Tolstoj quadrangle (Schaber and McCauley, 1980), the Caloris impact is considered to have occurred in late c3 time (McCauley and others, 1981).

One problem with the above-mentioned crater-dating technique on Mercury is that secondary craters occur closer to the principal crater and are thus more clustered than on the Moon, where they are relatively widespread. In consequence, an older crater adjacent to a fresh one becomes strongly degraded as a result of heavy bombardment by secondary craters from the younger crater and appears much older than it is.

Ghost craters are unusual forms that occur in the Suisei Planitia. They are buried and rounded in profile, with only their rim crests rising above the surrounding smooth plains. Therefore, these craters cannot be assigned a specific age; they may be of any age from late c1 to late c3.

== Structure ==
The most conspicuous structural elements in the quadrangle are the radial and concentric ridges and cracks inside the Caloris Basin and the ridges developed in the Odin Formation and smooth plains unit immediately outside Caloris. O'Donnell and Thomas (personal communication, 1979) have suggested, on the basis of orientation of features outside Caloris, that these ridges and scarps largely follow preexisting radial and concentric fracture patterns in the mercurian lithosphere initiated by the Caloris impact, similar in character to those around Imbrium on the Moon (Mason and others, 1976). Caloris itself consists of a single mountain ring and a weak outer scarp. A few sinuous scarps also occur in this quadrangle, including the Heemskerck Rupes which cuts the older intercrater plains. Scarps of this type are considered by Strom and others to be compressive thrust faults resulting from overall shortening of the mercurian crust early in its history.

== Geologic history ==
The history of the Shakespeare quadrangle as evidenced by materials exposed at the surface begins with the formation of intercrater plains material and of impact craters both older and younger than these plains. Some c1 and c2 craters were superposed on the intercrater plains. The intermediate plains material and lineated plains unit were emplaced over the intercrater plains, as were most craters of c3 age. Then followed the major asteroidal impact that produced the Caloris Basin and the emplacement of rocks of the Caloris Group around the basin. Comparison of crater populations on surfaces older and younger than Caloris suggests that at the time of the Caloris impact, the population of craters smaller than 30 km in diameter was eradicated from the pre-Caloris terrain (Guest and Gault, 1976). Gault and others (1976) suggested that the smaller craters were destroyed by the Caloris event and by other basin-forming events elsewhere on the planet at about the same time.

The smooth plains material was then emplaced. Some c3 craters were formed after the Caloris event and after some of the smooth plains were formed. Superposed on the smooth plains unit and on all older deposits were craters of c4 age, inside which was emplaced the very smooth plains material (unit pvs). Analogy with the Moon suggests that most of the recorded events in the history of Mercury occurred during the first 1.5 b.y. of the planet's life; the oldest major rock units in this quadrangle are probably at least 2 to 3 b.y. old. The geologic history of Mercury has been summarized by Guest and O'Donnell (1977), Davies and others, and Strom.

== Sources ==
- Guest, J.E.; Ronald Greeley (1983). "Geologic Map Of The Shakespeare (H-3) Quadrangle Of Mercury" (PDF). Prepared for the National Aeronautics and Space Administration by U.S. Department of the Interior, U.S. Geological Survey. Published in hardcopy as USGS Miscellaneous Investigations Series Map I–1408, as part of the Atlas of Mercury, 1:5,000,000 Geologic Series. Hardcopy is available for sale from U.S. Geological Survey, Information Services, Box 25286, Federal Center, Denver, CO 80225

== Bibliography ==
- Gault, D. E., Guest, J. E., and Schultz, P. H., 1976, Caloris changes in Mercury's crater populations: U.S. National Aeronautics and Space Administration, TMX-3364, p. 183–185.
- Gilbert, G. K., 1893, The Moon's face, a study of the origin of its features: Philosophic Society of Washington [D.C.] Bulletin, v. 12, p. 241–292.
- Guest. J. E., and Gault, D. E., 1976, Crater populations in the early history of Mercury, Geophysical Research Letters, v. 3 p. 121–l 23.
- Guest, J. E., and O'Donnell, W. P., 1977, Surface history of Mercury: A review: Vistas in Astronomy, v. 20, p. 273–300.
- Hapke, Bruce, Danielson, G. E. Jr., Klaasen, Kenneth, and Wilson, Lionel, 1975, Photommetric observations of Mercury from Mariner 10, 1975: Journal of Geophysical Research, v 80, no. 17, p. 2431–2443.
- James, O. B., 1977, Lunar highlands breccias generated by major impacts: Soviet- American conference on Cosmochemistry of the Moon and Planets: U.S. National Aeronautics and Space Administration, Special Publication SP-370, p. 637–658.
- Mallin, M. C., 1976, Observations of intercrater plains on Mercury: Geophysical Rescarch Letters, v. 3, p. 581–584.
- Mason. R., Guest, J. E., and Cooke, G. N., 1976, An Imbrium pattern of graben on the Moon: Geologists' Association, Proceedings, London, v. 87, part 2, p. 161–168.
- McCauley, J. F., 1967, The nature of the lunar surface as determined by systematic geologic mapping, in Runcorn, S. K., ed., Mantles of the Earth and terrestrial planets; London, Interscience Publications, p. 431–460.
- McCauley, J. F., 1977, Orientale and Caloris: Physics of the Earth and Planetary Interiors, v. 15, nos. 2–3, p. 220–250.
- McCauley, J. F., Guest, J. E., Schaber, G. G., Trask. N. J., and Greeley, Ronald, 1981, Stratigraphy of the Caloris Basin, Mercury: Icarus, v. 47, no. 2, p. 184–202.
- Murray, B. C., Belton, M. J. S., Danielson, G. E., Davies, M. E., Gault, D. E., Hapke, Bruce, O'Leary, Brian, Strom, R. G., Suomi, Verner, and Trask N. J., 1974a, Mariner 10 pictures of Mercury: First results: Science, v. 184, no. 4135, p. 459–461.
- _____1974b, Mercury's surface: Preliminary description and interpretation from Mariner 10 pictures: Science, v. 185, no. 4146, p. 169–179.
- Schaber, G. G., and McCauley, J. E., 1980, Geologic map of the Tolstoj quadrangle of Mercury: U.S. Geological Survey Miscellaneous Investigations Series Map I-1199, scale 1:5,000,000.
- Schultz, P. H., 1977, Endogenic modification of impact craters on Mercury: Physics of the Earth and Planetary Interiors, v. 15, nos. 2–3, p. 202–219.
- Scott, D. H., McCauley, J. F., and West, M. N., 1977, Geologic map of the west side of the Moon: U.S. Geological Survey Miscellaneous Investigations Series Map I1034, scale 1:5,000,000.
- Shoemaker, E. M., and Hackman, R. J., 1962, Stratigraphic basis for a lunar time scale, in Kopal, Zdenek, and Mikhailov, Z. K., eds., the Moon: International Astronomical Union Symposium, 14th, Leningrad, U.S.S.R., 1960: London, Academic Press, p. 289–300.
- Strom, R G., Murray, B. C., Belton, M. J. S., Danielson, G. E., Davies, M. E., Gault, D. E., Hapke, Bruce, O'Leary, Brian, Trask, N. J., Guest, J. E., Anderson, James, and Klaasen, Kenneth, 1975a, Preliminary imaging results from the second Mercury encounter: Journal of Geophysical Research, v. 80, no. 17, p. 2345–2356.
- Stuart-Alexander, D. E., 1971, Geologic map of the Rheita quadrangle of the Moon: U.S. Geological Survey Miscellaneous Geologic Investigations Map I-694, scale 1:1,000,000.
- Wilhelms, D. E., 1972, Geological mapping of the second planet: U.S. Geological Survey Interagency Report: Astrogeology 55, 36 p.
- Wilhelms, D. E., and McCauley J. F., 1971, Geologic map of the near side of the Moon: U.S. Geological Survey Miscellaneous Geologic Investigations Map I-703, scale 1:5,000,000.

H-1 Borealis (features)
H-5 Hokusai (features)	H-4 Raditladi (features)	H-3 Shakespeare (features)		H-2 Victoria (features)
H-10 Derain (features)	H-9 Eminescu (features)	H-8 Tolstoj (features)	H-7 Beethoven (features)	H-6 Kuiper (features)
H-14 Debussy (features)	H-13 Neruda (features)	H-12 Michelangelo (features)		H-11 Discovery (features)
H-15 Bach (features)
