= Morrison (crater) =

Crater on Mercury

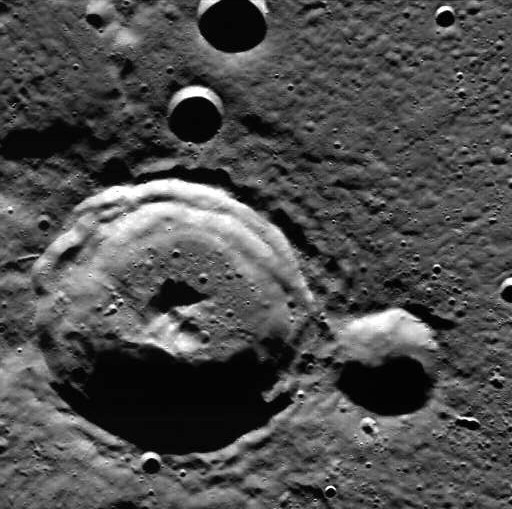
- MESSENGER WAC
- Planet: Mercury
- Coordinates: 79.66°N 232.57°E
- Quadrangle: Borealis
- Diameter: 35.0 km (21.7 mi)
- Eponym: Toni Morrison

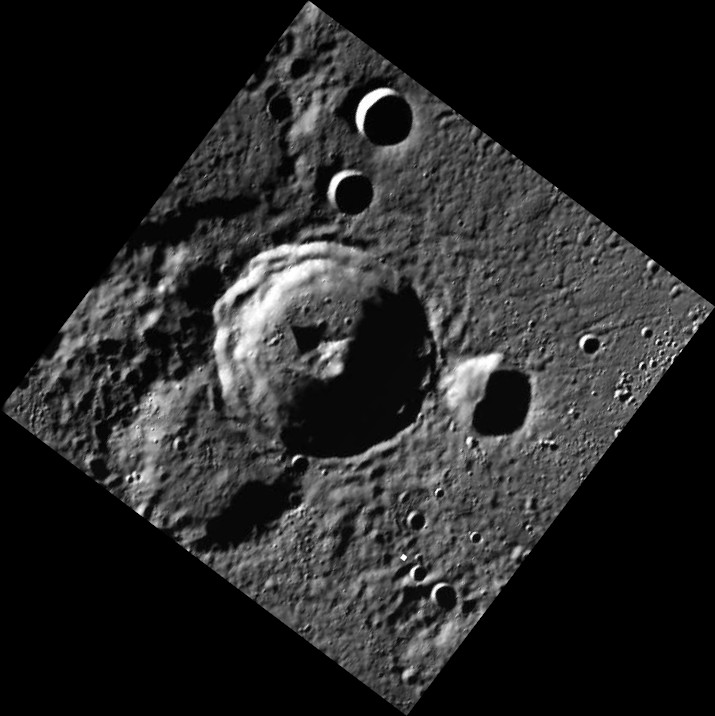
Another WAC image under different lighting

Morrison is a crater on Mercury. Its name was adopted by the International Astronomical Union in September 2022. Morrison is named for the American author Toni Morrison, who lived from 1931 to 2019.

Morrison has a region of permanent shadow along its southern rim, which has a bright radar signature. This is interpreted to represent a deposit of water ice.

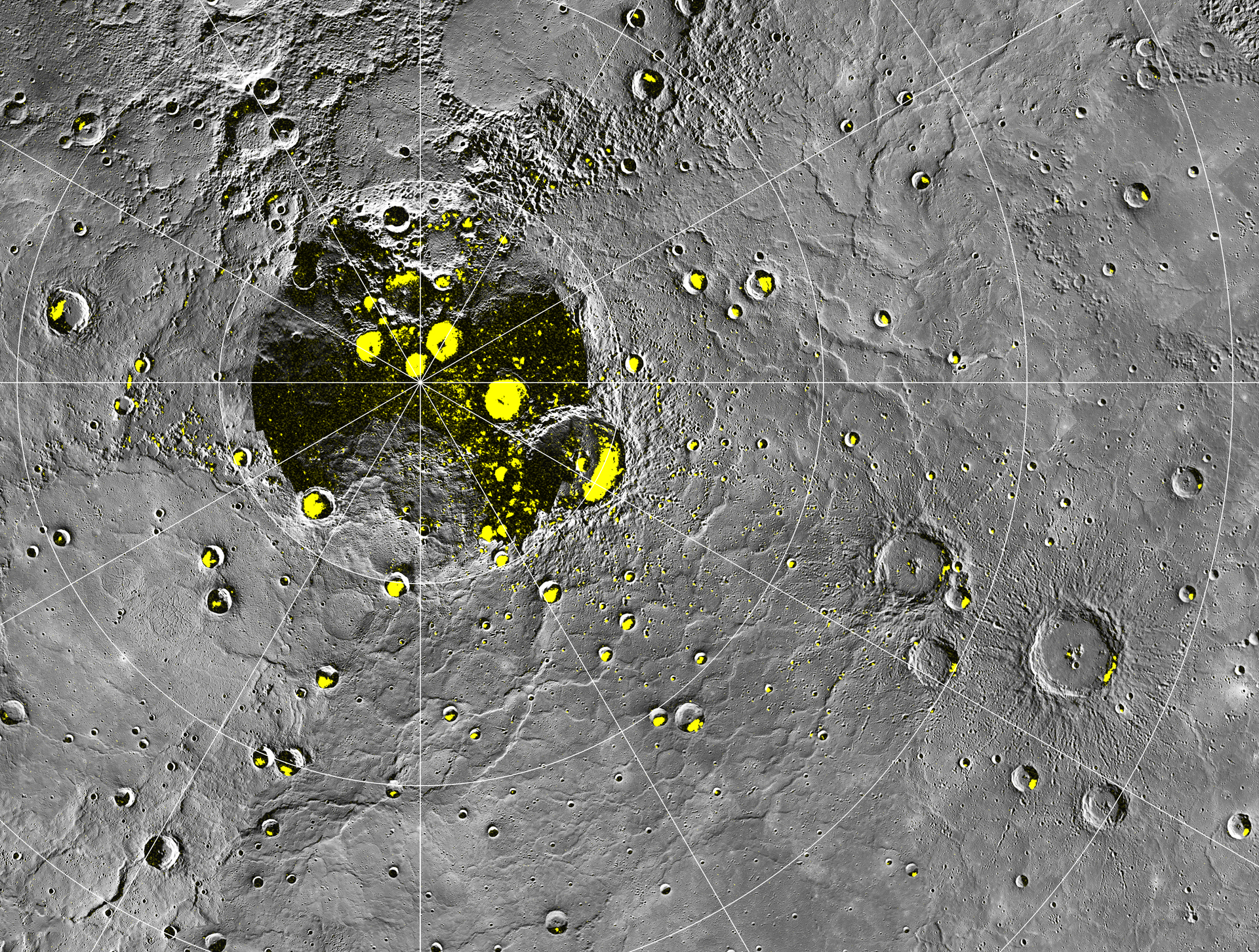
Radar-bright deposits near the north pole. Morrison is at upper left corner.

To the south of Morrison are the craters Mansart and Bjornson. To the north are Rizal and Josetsu. To the east is Despréz.
