= Desprez (disambiguation) =

Josquin des Prez (or Desprez) (c. 1450 – 1521) was a composer of High Renaissance music

Desprez or des Prez may also refer to:

== People ==
- Florian Desprez, a.k.a. Julian Florian Félix Desprez (1807–1895), French bishop and cardinal
- Frank Desprez (1853–1916), English playwright, essayist, and poet
- Louis Desprez (1799–1870), French sculptor
- Louis Jean Desprez (c. 1743–1804), French painter and architect
- Jean Desprez (a.k.a. Laurette Larocque, 1906–1965), French-Canadian writer and journalist
- Sainte des Prez(13th century), a trouvère poet-composer
- Desprez (actor) (1759–1829), French actor

== Toponyms ==
- Desprez Lake, a lake in Quebec, Canada
- Despréz (crater), a crater on Mercury

== See also ==
- Despres, also Després, Desprès, des Prés, Des Pres; French surname
- Deprez
