= Saint-Germain-des-Prés (disambiguation) =

Saint-Germain-des-Prés is a quarter of Paris, France.

Saint-Germain-des-Prés may also refer to:

== In Paris ==
- Saint-Germain-des-Prés (church), early medieval church from which the quarter took its name
- Saint-Germain-des-Prés station, Paris Metro station in the quarter
- Festival Jazz à Saint-Germain-des-Prés, jazz festival in the quarter

== Communes elsewhere in France ==
- Saint-Germain-des-Prés, Dordogne
- Saint-Germain-des-Prés, Loiret
- Saint-Germain-des-Prés, Maine-et-Loire
- Saint-Germain-des-Prés, Tarn

== See also ==
- Saint-Germain-des-Prés Café, a series of nu jazz compilation albums
- Saint-Germain (disambiguation)
- Després, surname
- Saint-Germain-près-Herment, commune in Puy-de-Dôme, France
