= Deprez =

Deprez or Déprez is a French/Belgian surname that may refer to

- Étienne Deprez-Crassier (1733–1803), French politician and army commander
- Gérard Deprez (born 1943), Belgian politician
- Hilaire Deprez (1922–1957), Belgian sprint canoer
- Kristoff Deprez (born 1981), Belgian association football player
- Louis Déprez (1921–1999), French cyclist
- Marcel Deprez (1843–1918), French electrical engineer
- Maurice Deprez (1886–?), Belgian ice hockey player
- Wouter Deprez (born 1975), Belgian comedian and cabaretier

== See also ==
- Desprez (disambiguation)
- Despres
