= Kosho =

Kosho may refer to:

== People ==
- Emperor Kōshō, the fifth imperial ruler of Japan to appear on the traditional list of emperors
- Kōshō Tateishi, Japanese yamabushi
- Kōshō Uchiyama (1912–1998), Japanese Sōtō priest and origami master

== Other uses ==
- Kōshō, a Japanese era spanning from 1455 to 1457
- Kōshō (crater), a crater on Mercury
- Kosho Shorei Ryu Kempo, a martial art system of Kenpo
- Yuzu koshō, a Japanese seasoning made of citrus peels and chili peppers
- Kōshō seido, a term used in sumo
- Kosho, a school of the Jōdo Shinshū Buddhist tradition
- Kosho, a fictional martial art portrayed in the 1967 TV series The Prisoner

== See also ==
- Kōshō-ji (disambiguation)
