= Grouvelle =

Grouvelle is a French surname. Notable people with the name include:

- Philippe-Antoine Grouvelle (1758–1806), French writer and journalist
- Laure Grouvelle (1803–1842), French politician
- Antoine Henri Grouvelle (1843–1917), French entomologist
