= Homura: The Crimson Warriors =

- Developers: Idea Factory; Design Factory
- Publisher: Otomate
- Artist: Shiki Sakumi
- Platforms: PlayStation Vita; Nintendo Switch
- Release: JP: June 28, 2018 (PS Vita); JP: February 15, 2024 (Switch); EU: March 31, 2026; NA: April 28, 2026
- Genre: Otome
- Mode: Single-player

Homura: The Crimson Warriors (真紅の焔 真田忍法帳, Kurenai no Homura Sanada Ninpoujou; 'Crimson Flames: Sanada Ninja Arts Chronicle') is a Japanese otome game developed by Otomate and released by Idea Factory for the PS Vita. It was initially planned for the PS4, however, that was later cancelled.

On February 15, 2024, a version for the Nintendo Switch titled Homura: The Crimson Warriors for Nintendo Switch (真紅の焔 真田忍法帳 for Nintendo Switch, Kurenai no Homura: Sanada Ninpou Chou for Nintendo Switch) was released.

The game was released in Europe on March 31, 2026 by Idea Factory International and it was released a month later on April 28 for North America.

== Production ==
The game was originally announced during the Otome Party 2016, which was held between August 13 and 14, 2016.

During the Otome Party 2017 (held between September 2 and 3, 2017), it was announced that the game would be released in 2018.

On October 20, 2023, Idea Factory announced that the game would be released for the Nintendo Switch as the first title of their Otomate Graffiti series.

On November 1, 2023, the opening movie for the Nintendo Switch version was official released. On November 15, a promotional video for the game was released.

== Plot ==
Fourteen years after the Battle of Sekigahara, the Toyotomi clan resolved to raise an army against the Tokugawa shogunate from their stronghold at Osaka Castle, calling upon daimyos across Japan to rally to their cause. While everyone else refused the Toyotomi's invitation, there were those who answered the call.

Among them was Sanada Nobushige, who had fought against the Tokugawa clan during the Battle of Sekigahara and was currently living in exile in Kudoyama, Kii Province. The ten ninjas serving Nobushige were none other than the legendary "Sanada Ten Braves." Together with them, Nobushige plotted his escape from Kudoyama to make his way to Osaka Castle.

== Characters ==
=== Main Characters ===
Mutsumi Mochizuki (望月六実, Mochizuki Mutsumi)
*Name can be changed by the player.
The protagonist of this game. Sixteen years old. She is the daughter of Rokuro Mochizuki, a Sanada ninja. She trained under Hakuunsai Tozawa in the ninja village. By order of her master, she enters the service of Sanada Nobushige to assist him in entering Osaka Castle.
Nobushige Sanada (真田信繁, Sanada Nobushige)
Voice: Junichi Suwabe
He was exiled to Kudoyama as punishment for siding with Ishida Mitsunari in the previous Battle of Sekigahara. Upon hearing rumors that the Toyotomi clan is raising an army, he attempts to escape Kudoyama to join their cause.
Sasuke Sarutobi (猿飛佐助, Sarutobi Sasuke)
Voice: Tomokazu Sugita
One of the Sanada ninjas. He is the youngest member of the Sanada Ten Braves.
Saizo Kirigakure (霧隠才蔵, Kirigakure Saizō)
Voice: Kazuyuki Okitsu
One of the Sanada ninjas. Formerly an Iga Ninja, he officially registered as a Sanada ninja after a past encounter where he challenged Nobushige Sanada and his men to a duel.
Juzo Kakei (筧十蔵, Kakei Jūzō)
Voice: Kenichi Suzumura
A retainer of Sanada Nobushige and a Sanada ninja. He originally served as Nobushige's kosho (page) and remained by his side even when Nobushige was exiled to Kudoyama.
Kamanosuke Yuri (由利鎌之介, Yuri Kamanosuke)
Voice: Soichiro Hoshi
One of the Sanada ninjas. He has a unique history of barging in on the Sanada family and demanding to become a subordinate.

=== Other Members of the Sanada Ten Braves ===
Seikai Nyudo Miyoshi (三好青海入道, Miyoshi Seikai Nyūdō)
Voice: Masaki Terasoma
A Buddhist monk and the older of the Miyoshi brothers. Indebted to the Sanada family for saving him in the past, he barged into Nobushige's residence, determined to be of use to the exiled lord.
Isa Nyudo Miyoshi (三好伊佐入道, Miyoshi Isa Nyūdō)
Voice: Katsuyuki Konishi
A Buddhist monk and the younger of the Miyoshi brothers. He barged into Nobushige's residence alongside his older brother to repay their debt to the Sanada family.
Kosuke Anayama (穴山小助, Anayama Kosuke)
Voice: Yuki Ono
A former retainer of the Sanada family. A highly capable leader of the Sanada household who handles cooking, laundry, and cleaning.
Rokuro Unno (海野六郎, Unno Rokuro)
Voice: Tarusuke Shingaki
A former retainer of the Sanada family. He has worked as a shinobi since the days when he was a standard Sanada retainer.
Jinpachi Nezu (根津甚八, Nezu Jinpachi)
Voice: Ryota Takeuchi
A former retainer of the Sanada family. When Nobushige was exiled, Jinpachi was unable to accompany him due to a strict limit on the number of attendants allowed. Upon hearing that Nobushige plans to join the Toyotomi clan's uprising, he rushes to Nobushige's side.

=== Ura-Yagyu ===
Byakuren (白蓮, Byakuren)
Voice: Tomoaki Maeno
The leader of the Ura-Yagyu. He commands a mysterious group known as the "Onibi" (Demon Fire) through the use of secret arts.
Bishamon (ビルマ, Bishamon)
Voice: Takashi Koyama
A member of the Onibi.
Yuzen'in (融仙院, Yūzen'in)
Voice: Kentaro Ito
A member of the Onibi.
Gracia (グラシア, Gurashia)
Voice: Kikuko Inoue
A member of the Onibi.
Hachiro Chinzei (鎮西八郎, Chinzei Hachirō)
Voice: Nobuyuki Hiyama
A member of the Onibi.
Awa-no-kami (安房守, Awa no Kami)
Voice: Tadashi Miyazawa
A member of the Onibi.
Ganryu (巌流, Ganryū)
Voice: Kazuya Murakami
A member of the Onibi.

=== Other Characters ===
Nobutada Sanada (真田信尹, Sanada Nobutada)
Voice: Yoji Ueda
Masayuki Sanada's younger brother and Nobushige Sanada's uncle.
Hideyori Toyotomi (豊臣秀頼, Toyotomi Hideyori)
Voice: Kazuhiro Yoshimura
Hideyoshi Toyotomi's son.

== Opening and ending theme songs ==
The opening theme, title FLAMING was performed by Riko Sasaki, the lyrics were planned by Teruji Yoshizawa, and the composition was done by Koichiro Takahashi.

The ending theme, titled Yume no Ato (ユメノアト; 'The vestiges of a dream'), was also performed by Riko Sasaki, with lyrics written and composed by Hisao Sasaki.

The insert song, titled Koyoi, Eien no Chikai wo (今宵、永遠の誓いを; 'Tonight, let us make our eternal vows') was also sung by Riko Sasaki with lyrics written and composed by Hisao Sasaki.
