= Mansart =

Mansart may refer to:

- François Mansart (1598–1666), French architect
- Jules Hardouin-Mansart (1646–1708), French architect, his grandnephew
- Mansart (crater), a crater on Mercury

== See also ==
- Mansard roof
