= Jókai (crater) =

Crater on Mercury

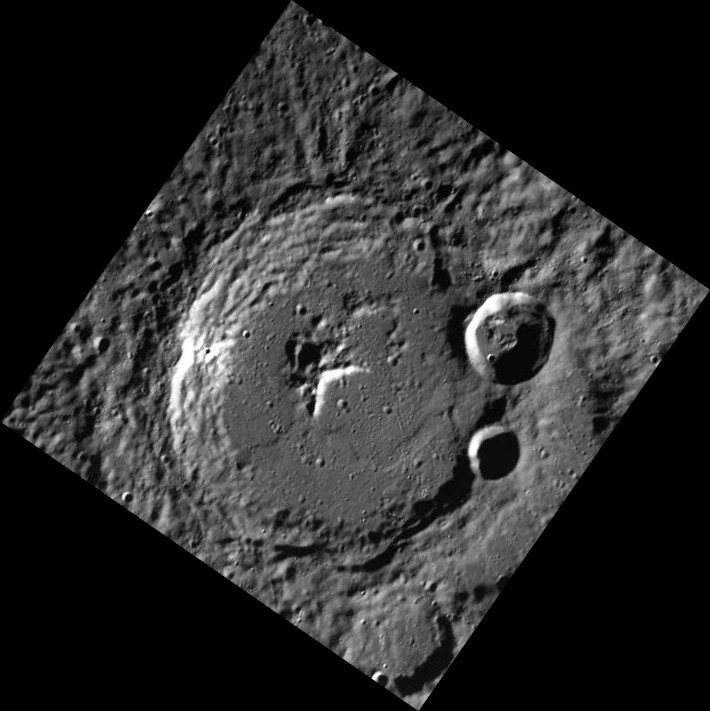
- MESSENGER WAC of Jókai
- Feature type: Central-peak impact crater
- Location: Borealis quadrangle, Mercury
- Coordinates: 71.93°N 138.45°W
- Diameter: 93.0 km (57.8 mi)
- Eponym: Mór Jókai

Jókai is a crater on Mercury. Its name was adopted by the International Astronomical Union (IAU) in 1979. Jokai is named for the Hungarian novelist Mór Jókai, who lived from 1825 to 1904.

The final image by the MESSENGER spacecraft was acquired south of the south rim of Jókai on 30 April 2015. The spacecraft impacted the planet later that day close to the crater Janáček.

To the south of Jókai is Turgenev crater, and to the east are Mansart and Bjornson.

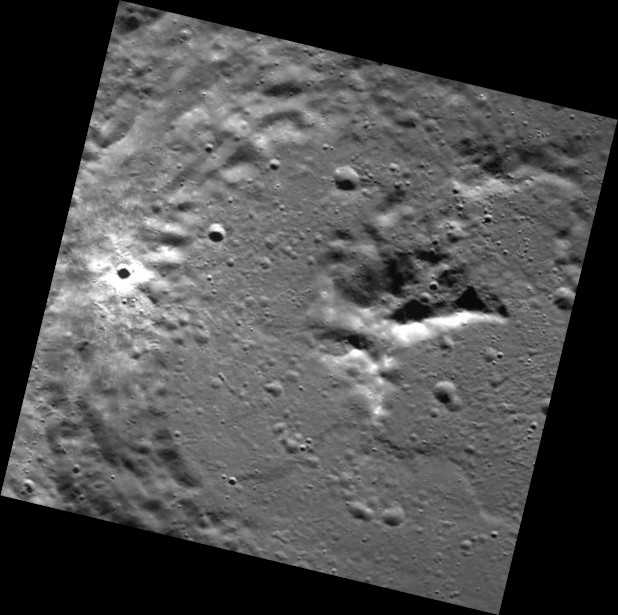
Central Jókai crater

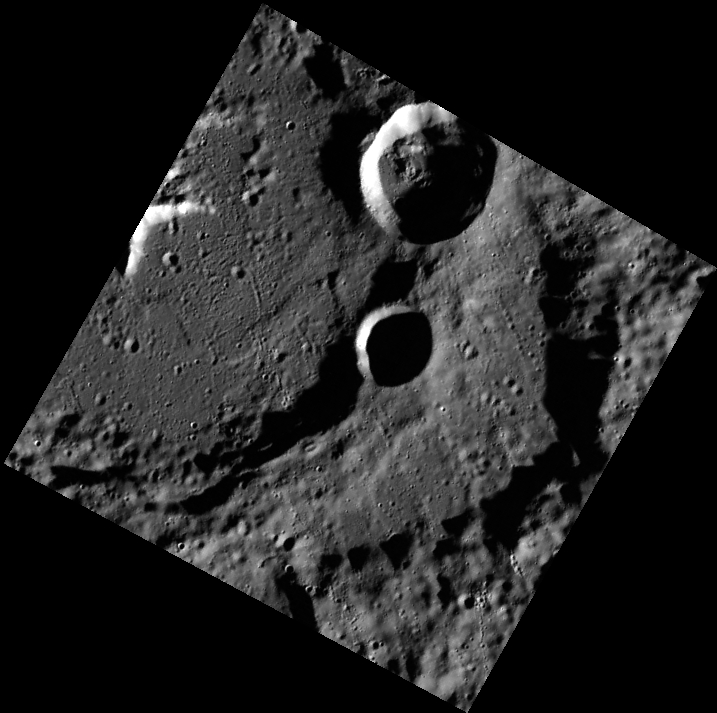
Another view at low sun angle

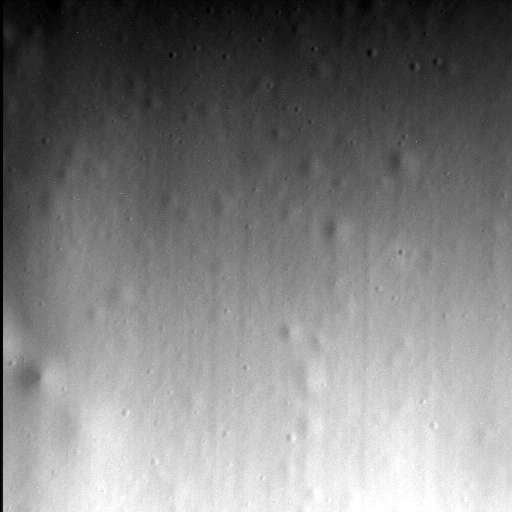
Final image acquired by MESSENGER
