= Festival Jazz à Saint-Germain-des-Prés =

French jazz festival

Festival Jazz à Saint-Germain-des-Prés was founded in 2001 by Joël Le Roy, Frédéric Charbaut, and Donatienne Hantin. It has been held annually in May (and early June) in the traditional intellectual district Saint-Germain-des-Prés and the surroundings on the left bank of the river Seine in Paris.

The performances take place in public places and streets as well as indoor and are partly free (like a vocal jazz concert on Place Saint-Germain-des-Près). Other venues are for example the Kirche von Saint-Germain-des-Prés, the Théâtre National de l’Odéon and the Fnac Music shop in Montparnasse, the Sunset and Sunside Jazz Club in the Rue des Lombards, various institutes, cultural houses, hotels and shops. There are also exhibitions, and even a Swing-Ball (Grand Bal Swing) with clothes from the 1950s.

In 2013 musicians like Stéphane Huchard, Biréli Lagrène (with Philip Catherine, Boulou Ferré), Thierry Maillard, Didier Lockwood, Paolo Fresu, Manu Dibango, Édouard Ferlet, Trilok Gurtu, Mina Agossi, Paco Séry, Michel Portal (with Quatuor Ébène) and Monty Alexander among others appeared on the scenes.

There is a separate series of Jazz au féminine and events for young people (Tremplin jeunes talents) with a competition prize. The concerts of the newcomer competition are freely accessible.

Saint-Germain connects to the modern jazz tradition from the time of the existentialist movement at the end of the 1940s and early 1950s with many exiled Jazzmusikers from the USA who settled in Paris.

The founders are Joël Le Roy, Frédéric Charbaut and Donatienne Hantin. Charbaut has the artistic direction.

== See also ==
- List of jazz festivals
