= Yagoto =

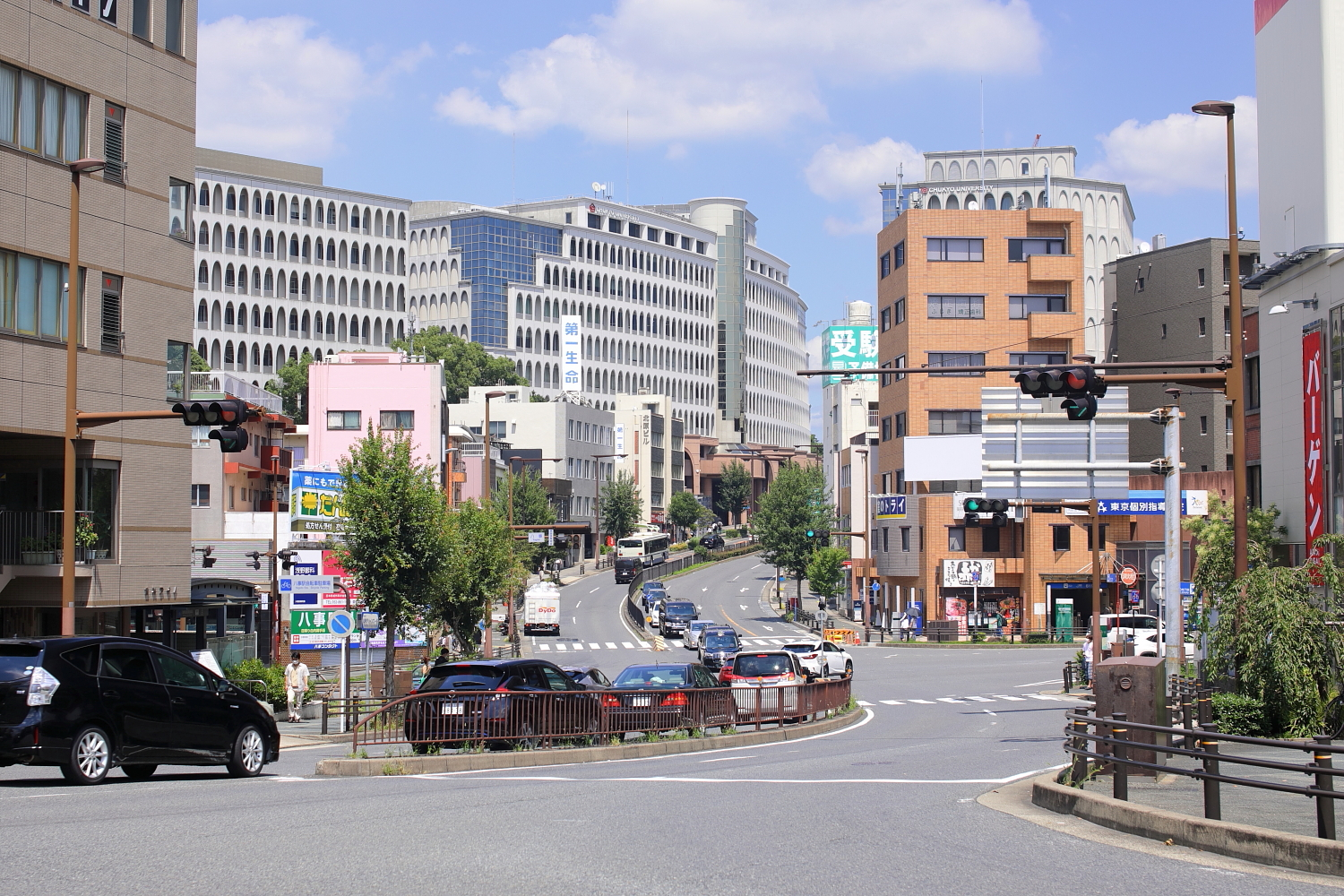
Yamate Green Road intersection in Yagoto

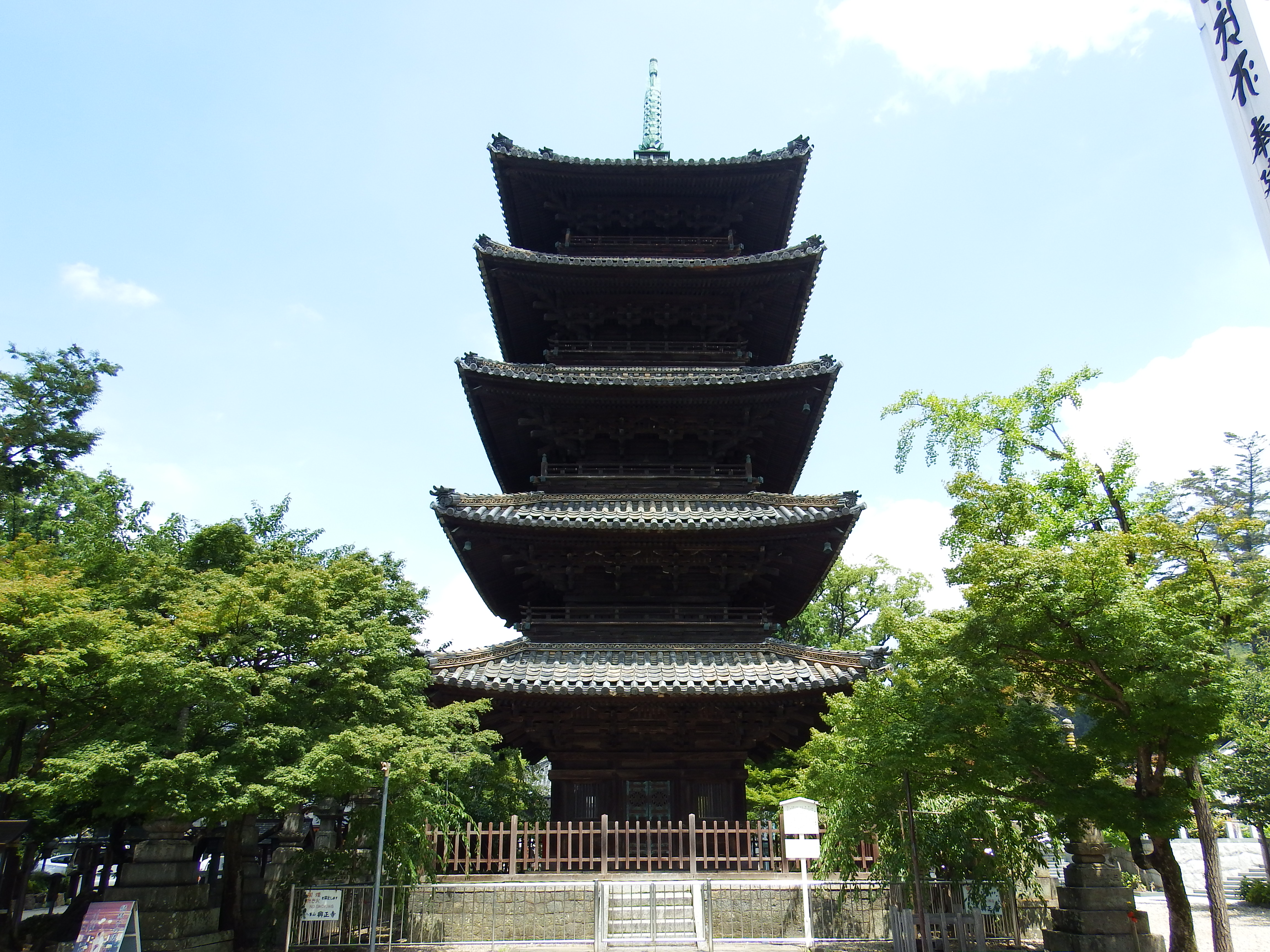
Main pagoda of Kōshō-ji temple

Yagoto (八事) is a neighbourhood that straddles Mizuho ward, Shōwa ward, and Tempaku ward in eastern Nagoya, central Japan.

== History ==
The area is also known as Yagotoyama.

During the Edo period, the area thrived as a pilgrimage area with various temples, of which the most central one was Kōshō-ji. Other temples within the immediate area of Kōshō-ji are Tokurin-ji, Saiko-in, Joshō-ji, Seigan-ji, Kōshin-ji, Hōju-in, and Hansobo Temple, although many were moved here during World War II.

The Hayato-ike is a large pond that was originally dug in 1646 for irrigation purposes on the order of Lord Naruse of Inuyama. The pond and park around it has turned into a recreation area and is popular during the cherry blossom season.

Various universities and educational facilities were established here. North from Yagoto in the Yotsuya and Yamanote-dori districts are Chukyo University, and the campuses of the Nagoya University and Nanzan University.

The area also has various shopping areas, such as the large Aeon department store, formerly JUSCO, and restaurants such as the landmark Kani Dōraku next to Kōshō-ji.

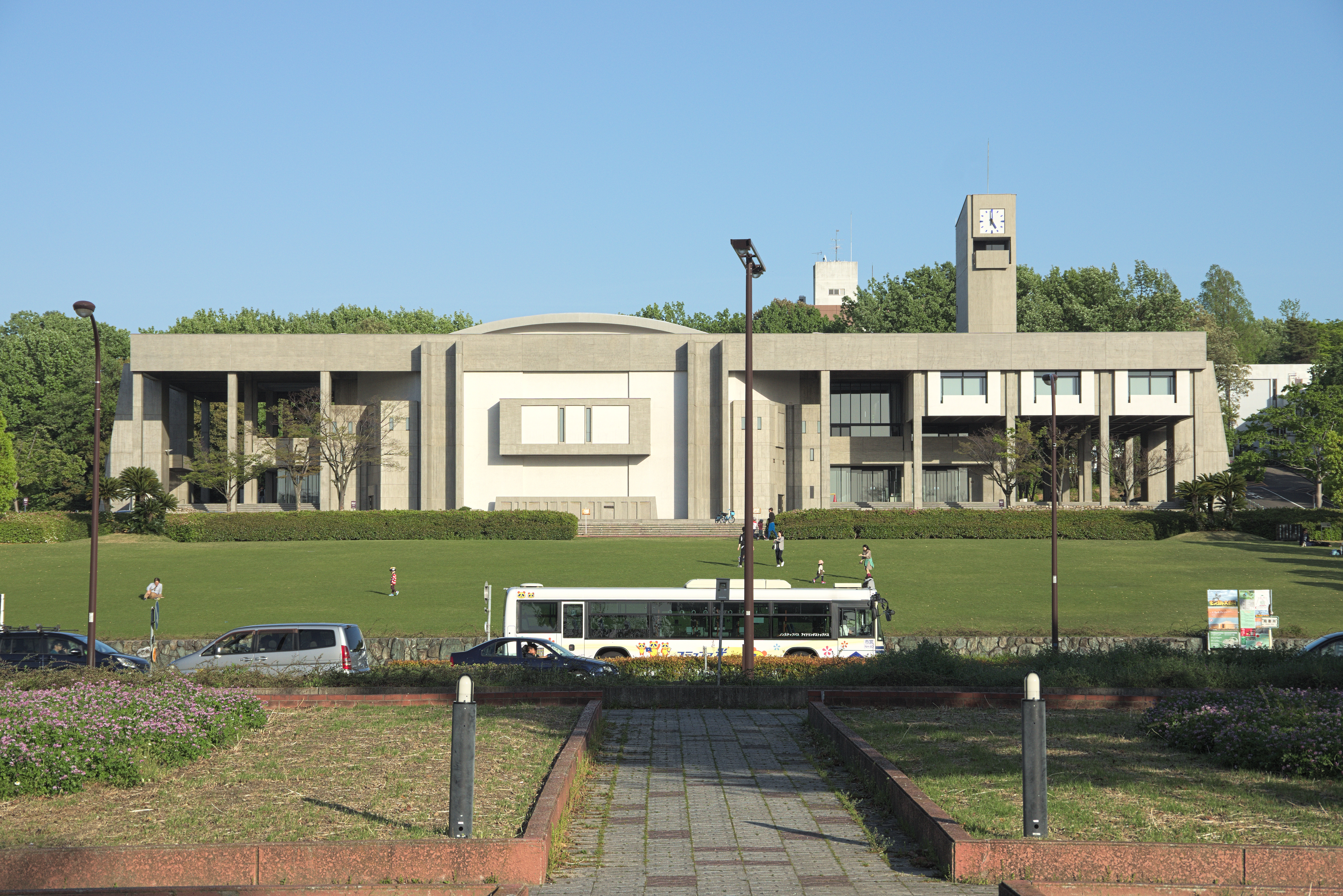
Nagoya University

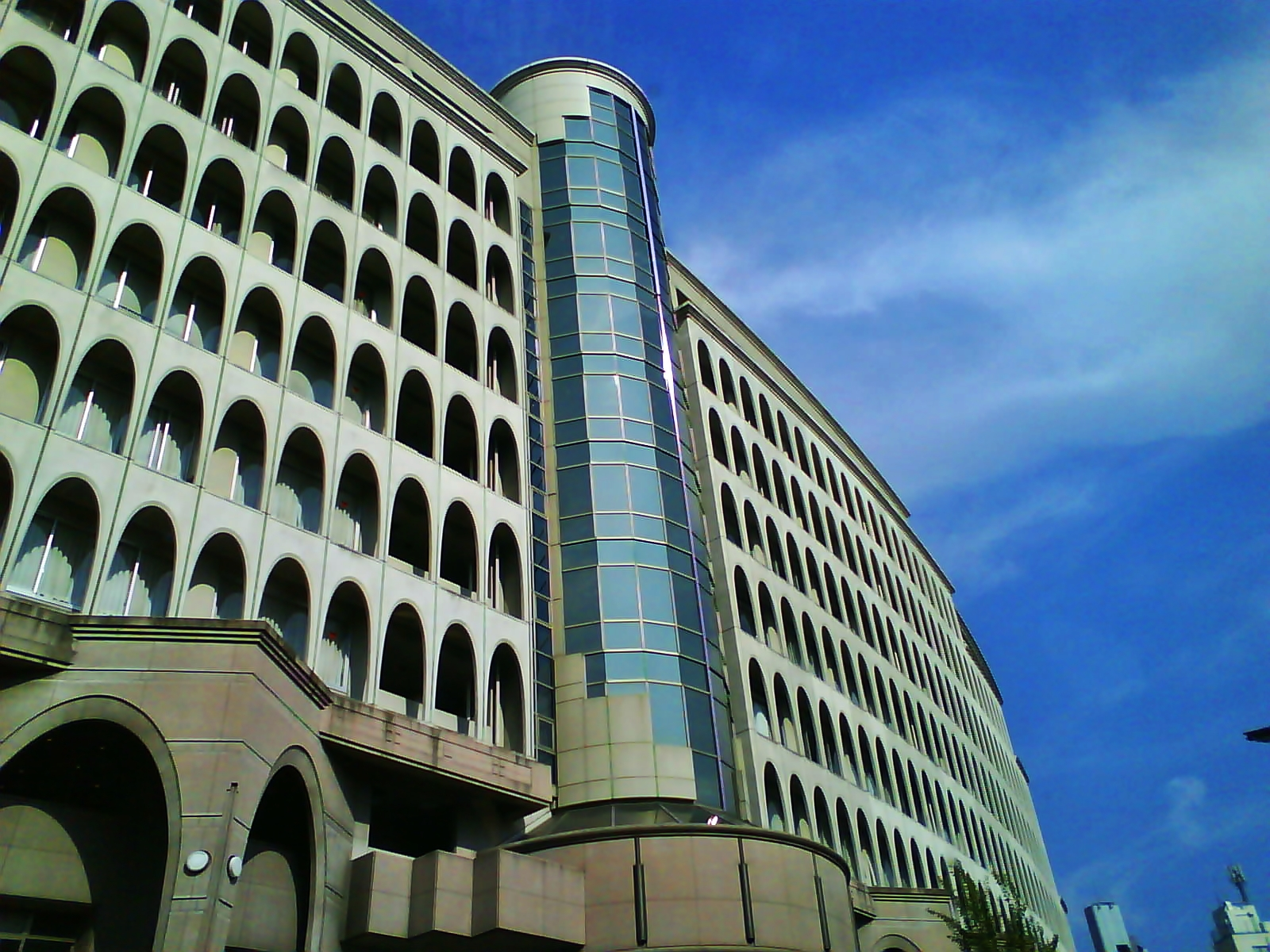
Chukyo University main building

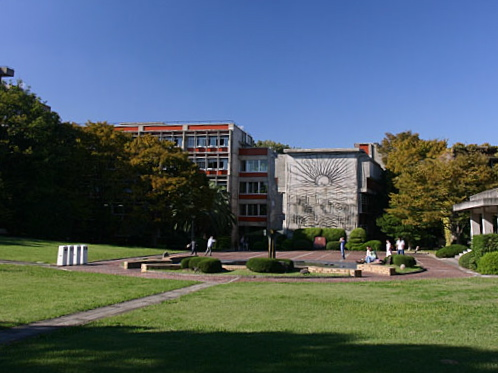
Nanzan University

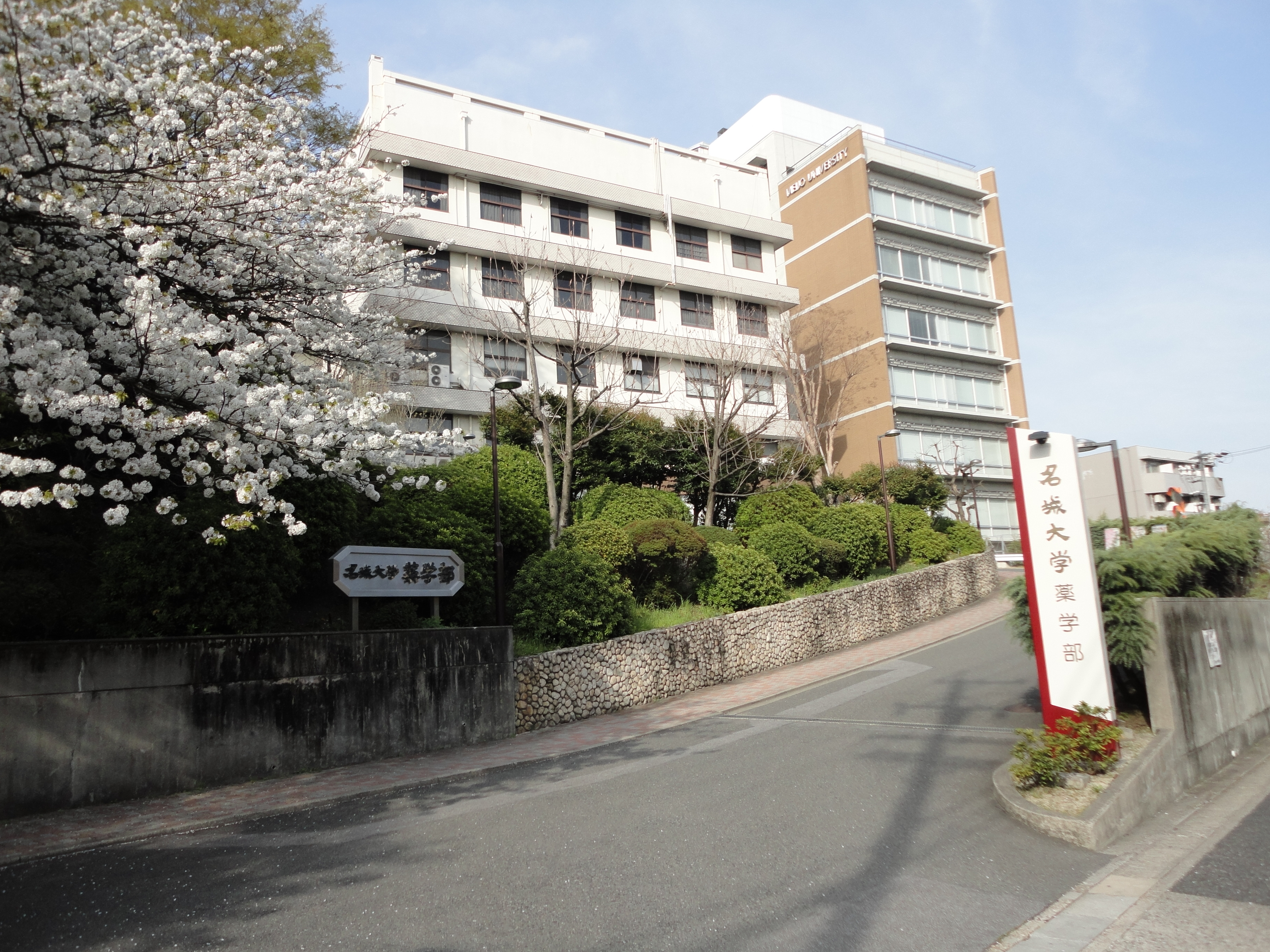
Meijo University Yagoto Campus

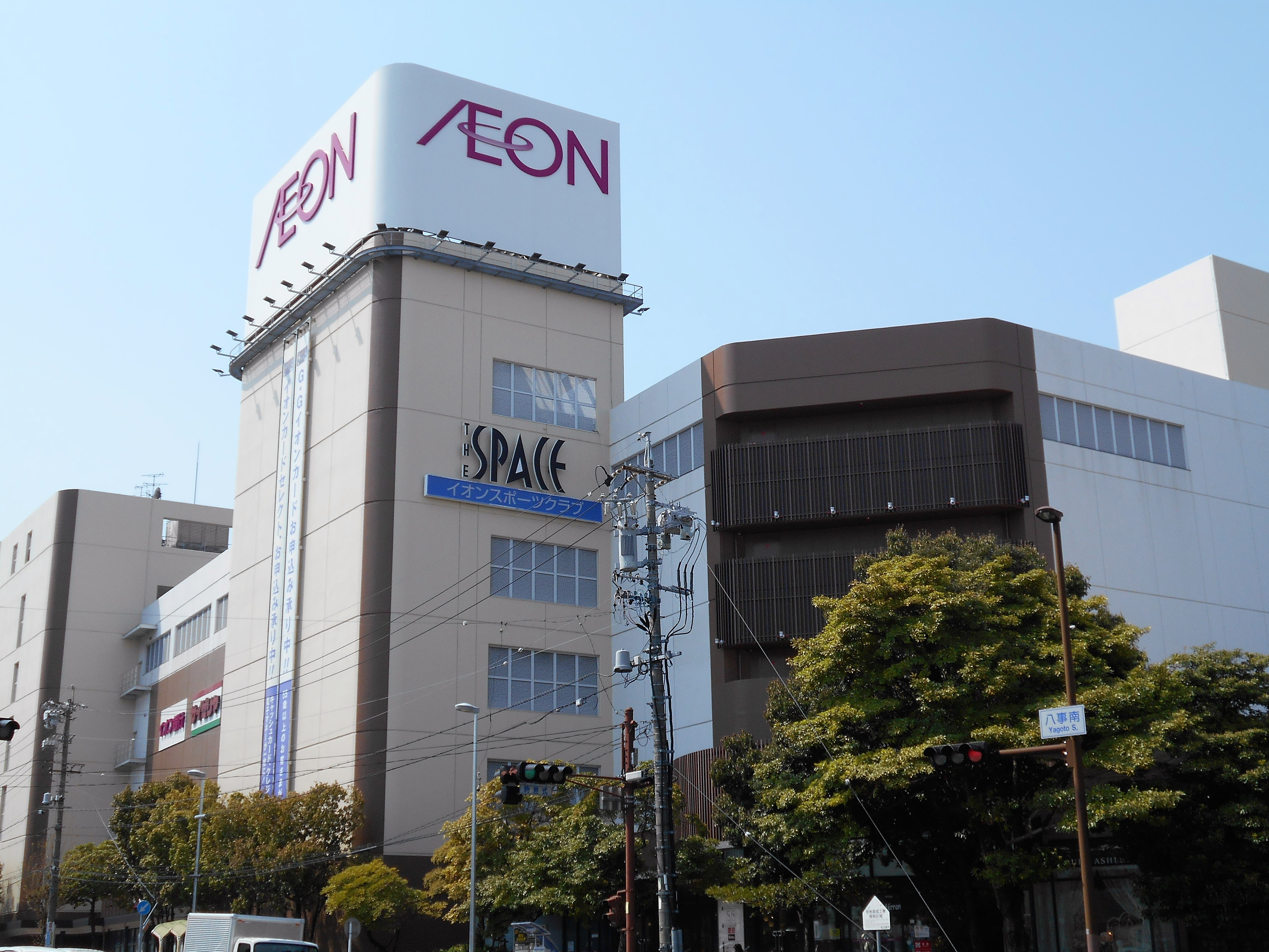
AEON Yagoto department store, formerly JUSCO

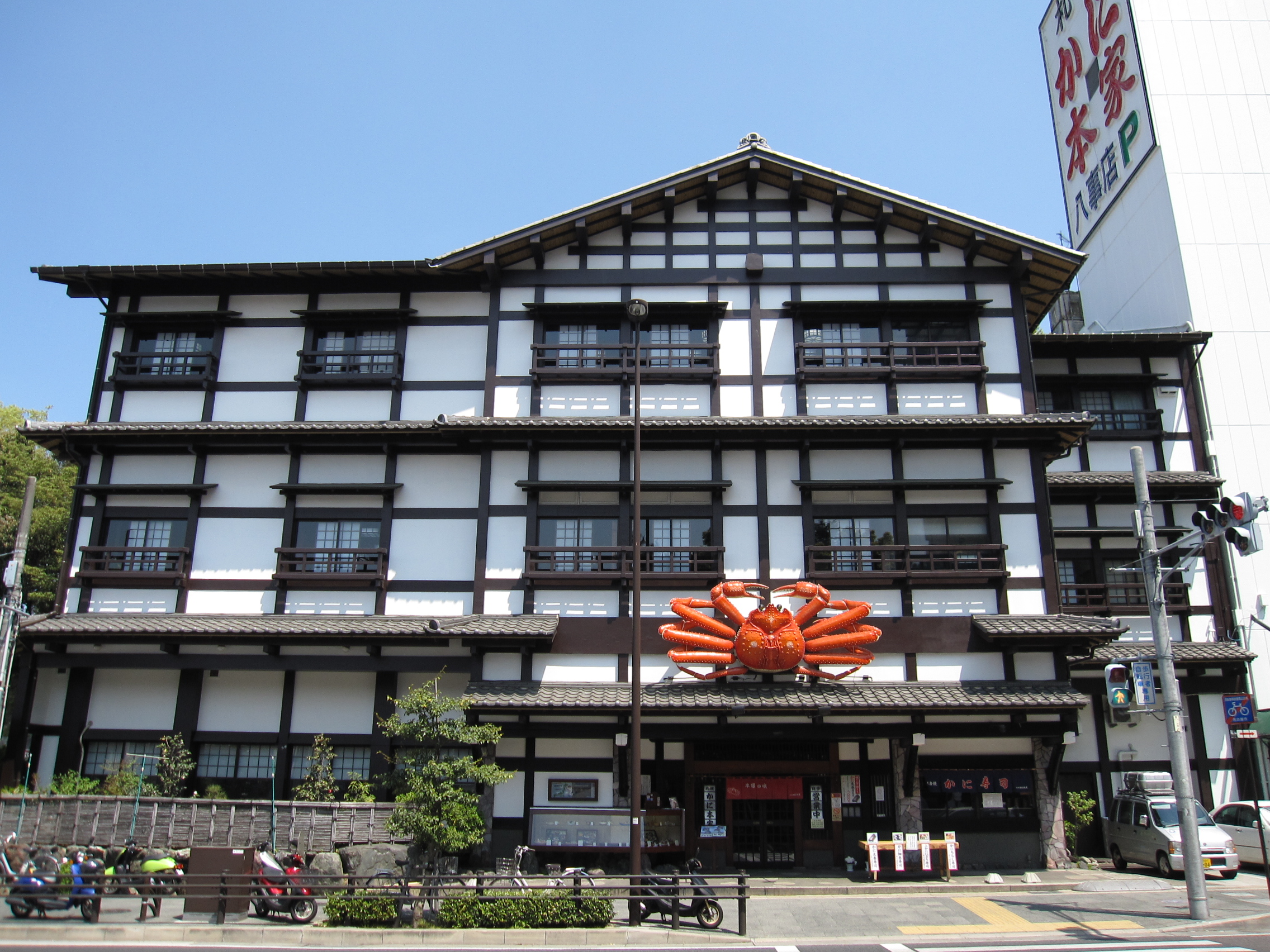
Kani Dōraku restaurant

In the east of Yagoto is the Yagoto Cemetery.

== Transport ==
The main artery is the Yamate road.

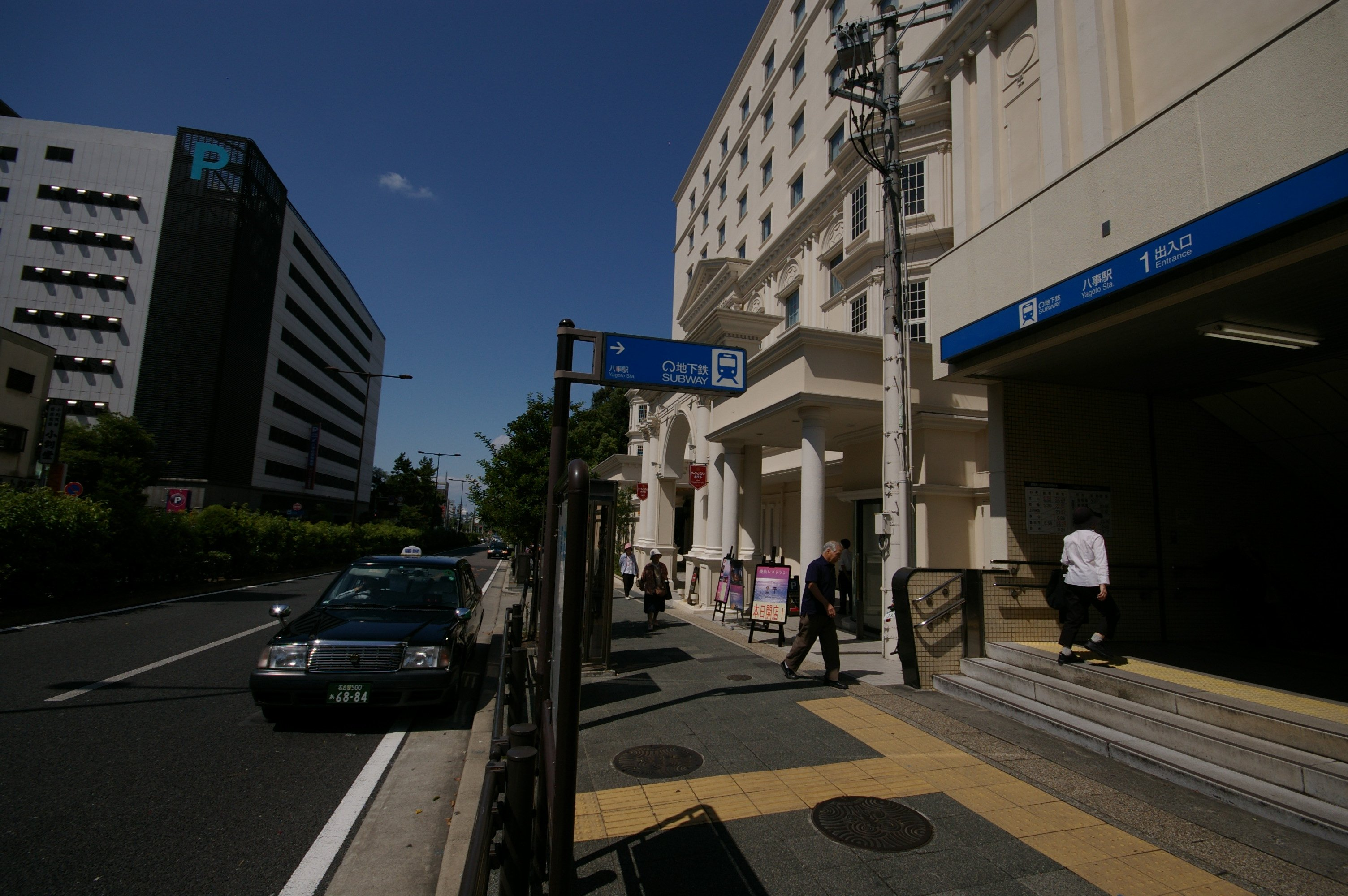
Entrance 1 of Nagoya Subway Yagoto Station

The area is served by Yagoto Station on the Nagoya Subway Tsurumai Line and Meijō Line (the latter since 2004).
