= Philippe-Antoine Grouvelle =

Philippe-Antoine Grouvelle (27 February 1758, Paris – 30 September 1806, Varennes, Essonne) was an 18th-century French man of letters and journalist.

== Biography ==
The son of a goldsmith, Grouvelle was placed with a notary, who, seeing him busier making verses than acts, dismissed him. Chamfort then took him as secretary, and when he left the job of secretary to the Prince of Condé, Chamfort arranged for Grouvelle to take his place.

Grouvelle was successful in Versailles where the Queen had his little opera Prunes performed which he had written with Desprez. 20 June 1788, he had a comedy entitled l’Épreuve délicate presented at the Théâtre-Français but it had one performance only and was not published.

When the French Revolution broke out, Grouvelle adopted its principles, was a founder of the Society of 1789 and published a policy brochure dated from the very Palais Bourbon. Therefore, he could no longer remain in service to the Prince. After he left him, he engaged into an association with Chamfort, Joseph-Antoine Cerutti and Rabaut de Saint-Étienne in order to publish la Feuille villageoise.

After he became Secretary of the Provisional Executive Council in August 1792, he had to bring to Louis XVI at the Prison du Temple the sentence condemning him to death. Jean-Baptiste Clery, in his memoirs, said that "Grouvelle read off with a low, trembling voice, and he came out of prison in a marked agitation".

In May 1793, Grouvelle was sent to Denmark as Minister of France, and performed his functions until 1800. He was then called to the Corps législatif, where he served until September 1802.

== Publications ==
- Satire universelle, prospectus dédié à toutes les puissances de l’Europe, Paris, 1788, in-8°; (Pamphlet against Rivarol, composed by Grouvelle with Cerutti's help and inserted in the Œuvres of the latter.)
- De l’autorité de Montesquieu dans la révolution présente, Paris, 1789, in-8°; (Reprinted in vol. VII of the Bibliothèque de l’Homme public.)
- Adresse des habitants du ci-devant bailliage de… à M. de…, leur député à l’Assemblée nationale, sur son duel et sur le préjugé du point d’honneur, Paris, 1796, in-8°; (Reprinted under the title Point de duel ou point de constitution; Adresse des habitants du ci-devant bailliage, etc., 1790, in-8°)
- Réponse à tout petit colloque entre un sénateur allemand et un républicain français, Taciturnus Memoriosas, traduit librement par un sans-culotte, Copenhague, 1793, in-8°;
- Lettre en vers à ma sœur sur le roman philosophique et sentimental de Woldemar, Copenhague, 1797, in-8°; See Études germaniques
- Mémoire historique sur les Templiers, ou éclaircissements sur leur procès, les accusations intentées contre eux et les causes secrètes de leur ruine, puisés en grande partie dans plusieurs monuments ou écrits publiés en Allemagne, Paris, 1805, in-8°

Grouvelle also gave an edition of the Lettres of the marquise de Sévigné, with a notice and historical notes; 1806, 8 vol. in-8°, ou 11 vol. in-12, and the Œuvres de Louis XIV, 1806, 6 vol. in-8°, with Philippe Henri de Grimoar, who was in charge of the military part of this work.

== Sources ==
- Ferdinand Hoefer, Nouvelle Biographie générale, t. 22, Paris, Firmin-Didot, 1858, (p. 234).
- "Philippe-Antoine Grouvelle", in Adolphe Robert and Gaston Cougny, Dictionnaire des parlementaires français (1789–1891), Bourloton, Paris, 1889 Edition details Wikisource
