= Kōshō-ji, Nagoya =

Buddhist temple in Nagoya, Japan

Coordinates: 35°08′26″N 136°57′45″E

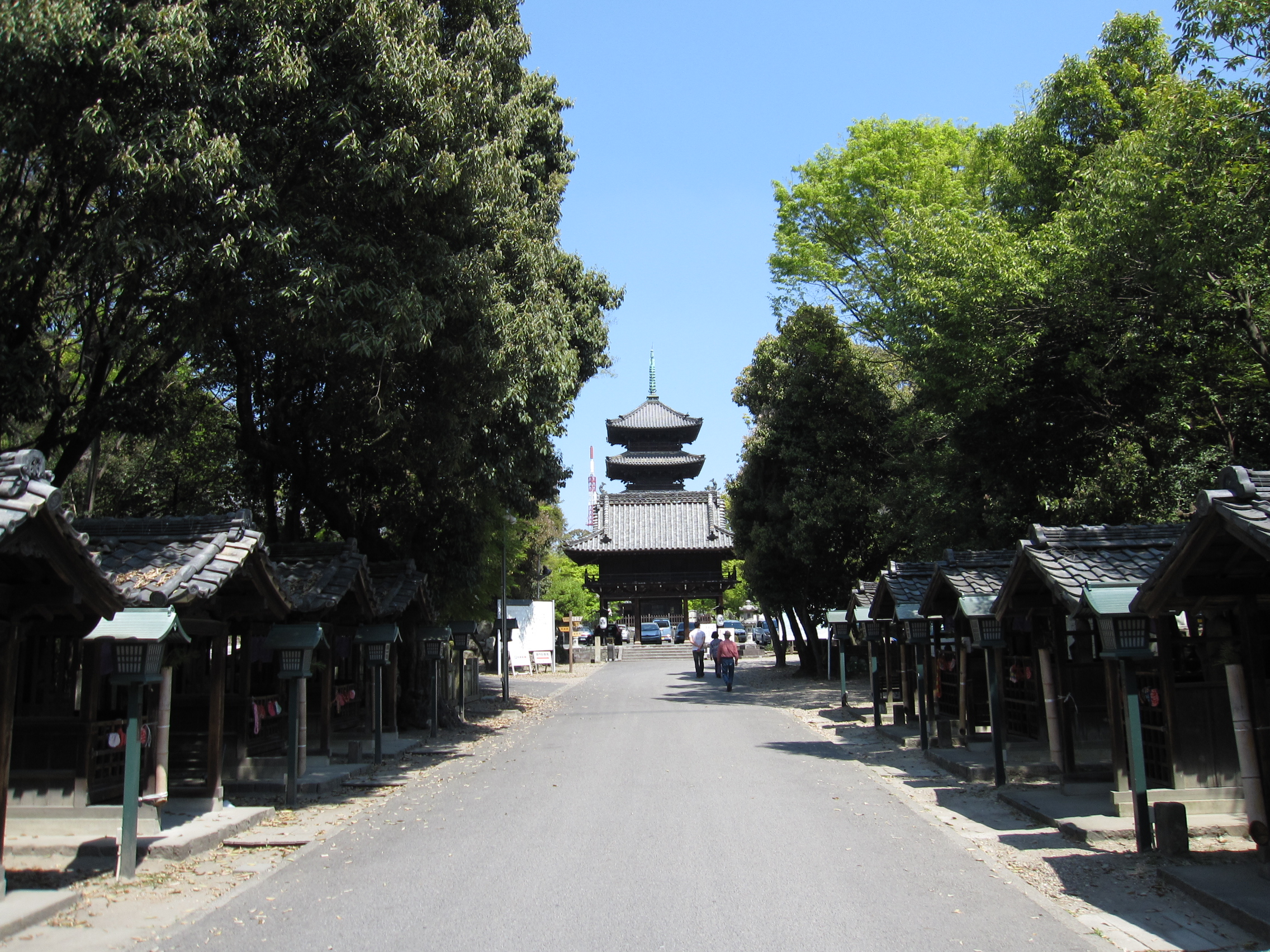
Main path leading to the middle gate and pagoda of Kōshō-ji

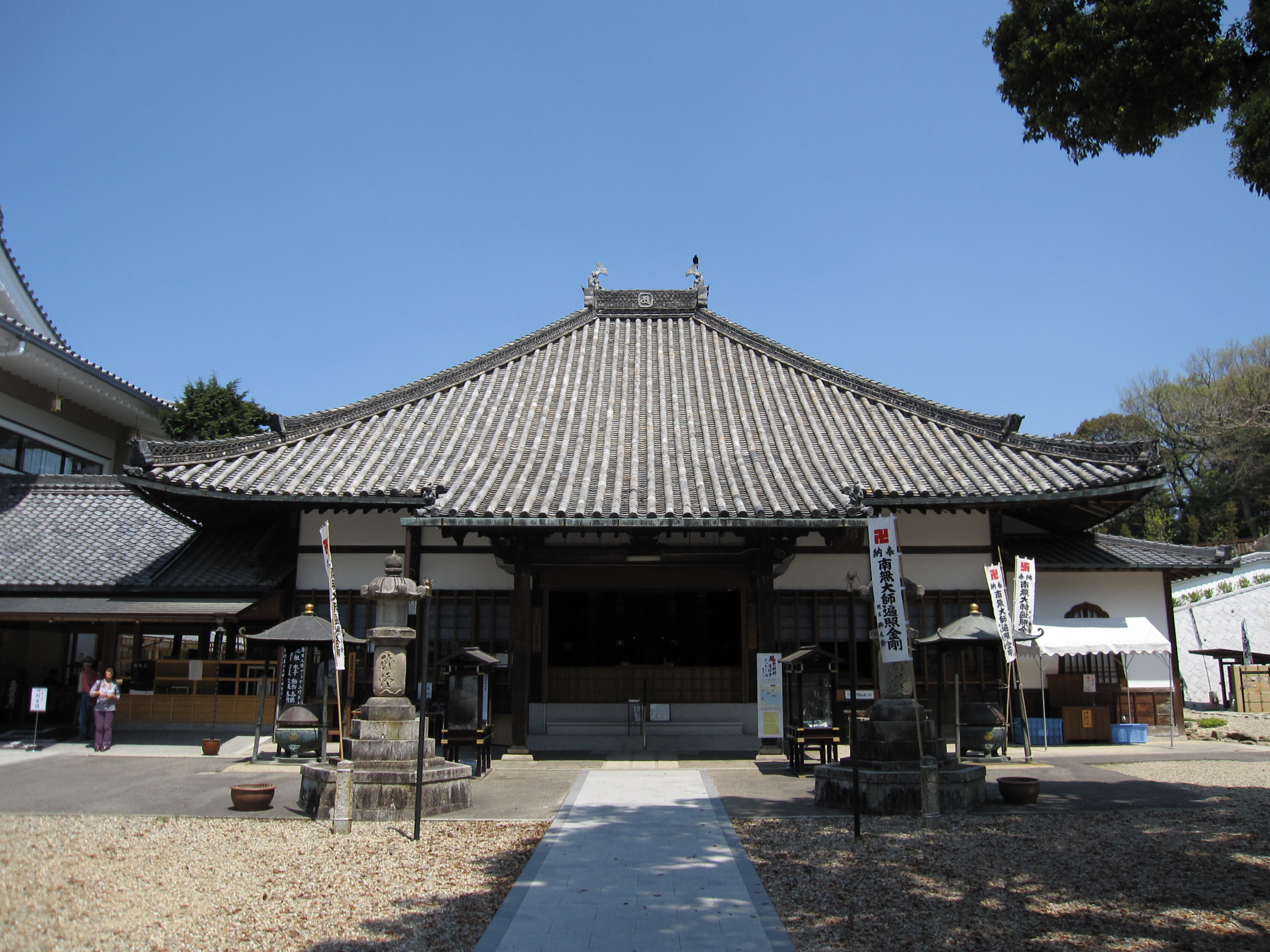
Main prayer hall

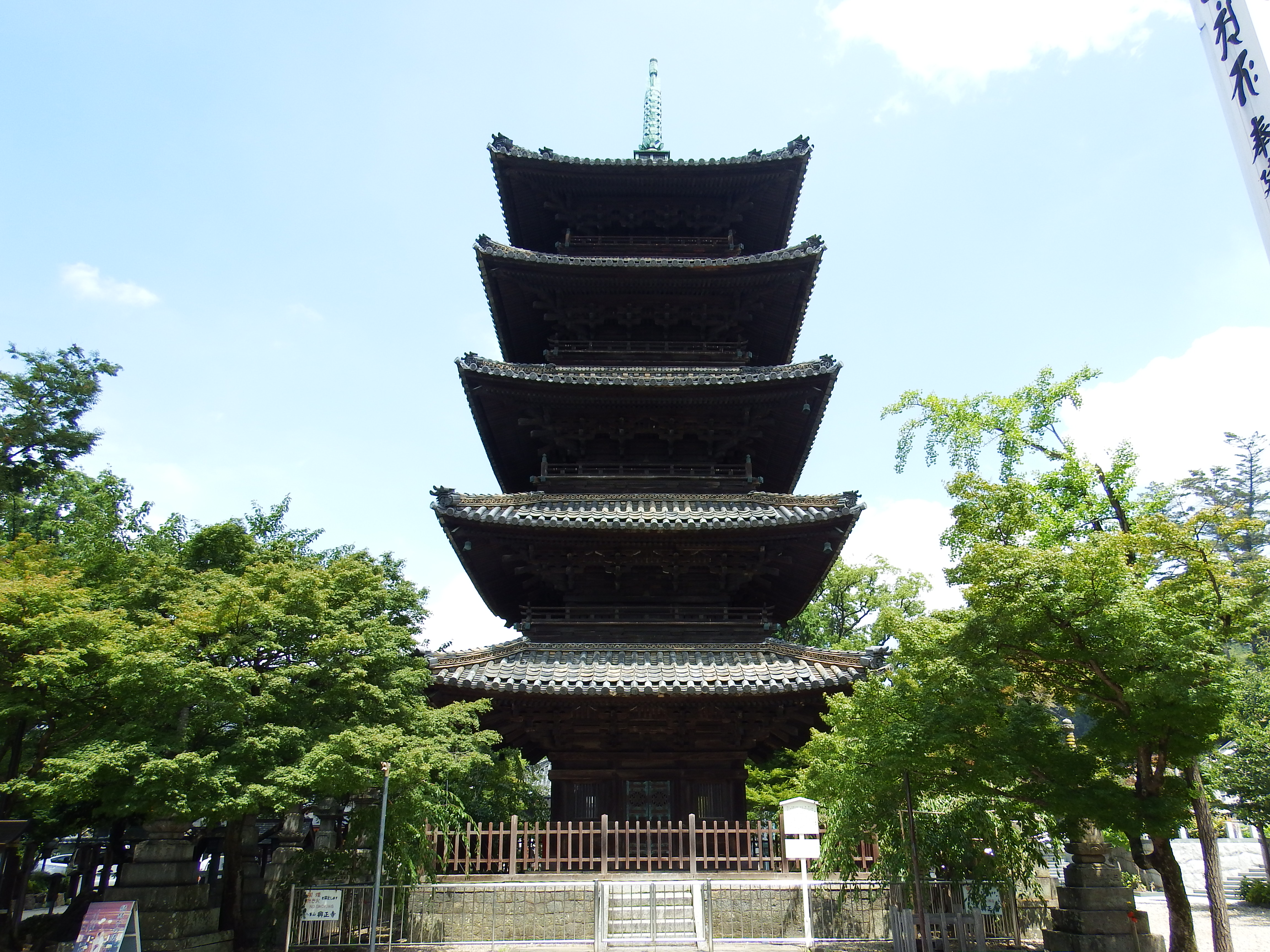
pagoda

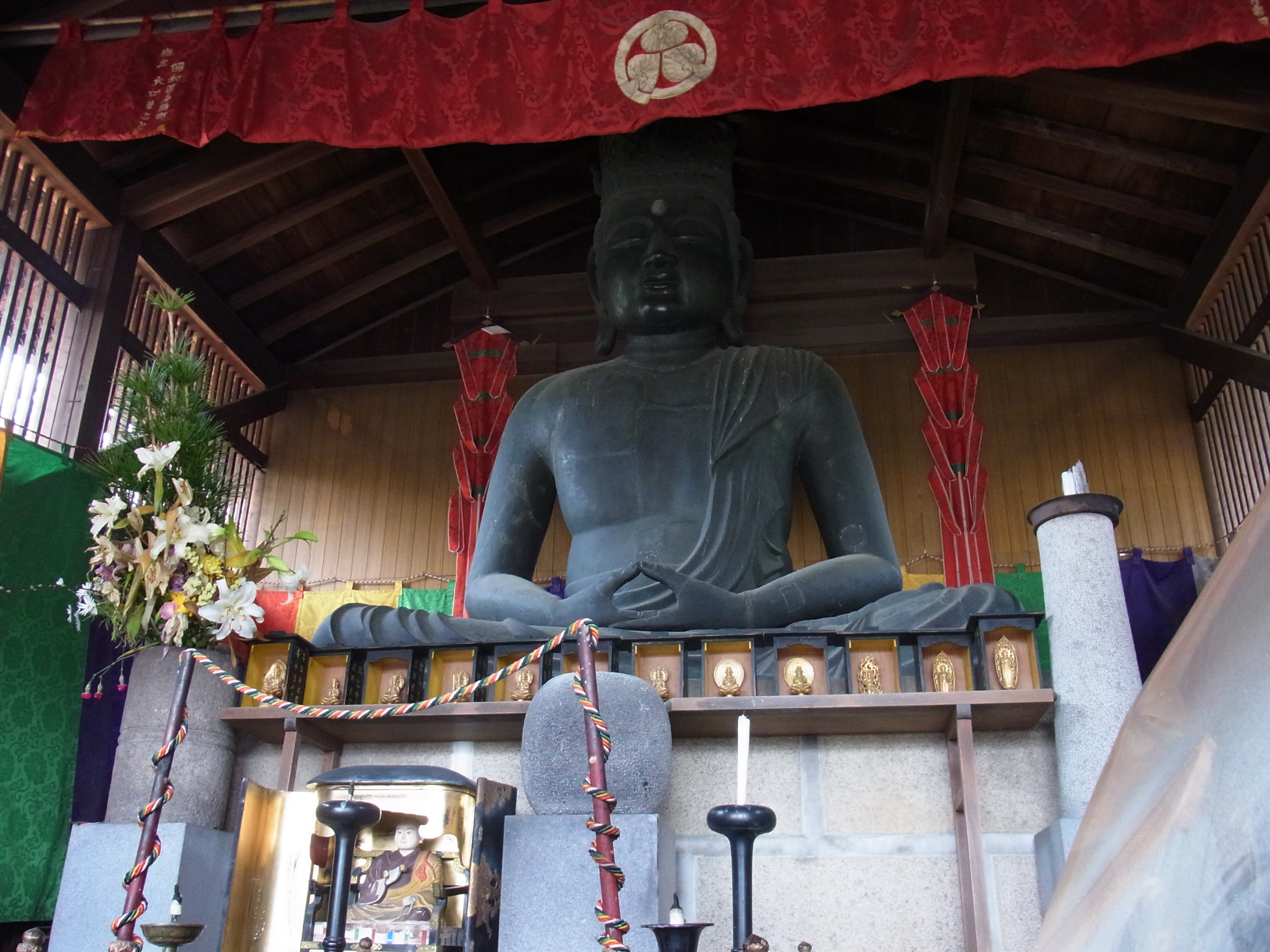
Vairocana

Kōshō-ji (興正寺) is a Shingon Buddhist temple located in Yagoto, Nagoya, in central Japan. It belongs to the Owari Thirty-three Kannon.

== History ==
The temple was established by the Tokugawa clan and dates to the 17th century. The temple and grounds of its attached graveyard are situated in the woodland on Yagoto Hill. The complex consists of a number of wooden buildings, which includes a five-storey pagoda completed in 1808. The pagoda is the oldest in Aichi prefecture and was designated an Important Cultural Asset in 1982.

The temple used to be the centre of what was a flourishing pilgrimage area.

The annual "1,000-Lantern Festival" at the harvest moon takes places at Kōshō-ji. Small popular flea-markets take place on the 5th and 13th of every month. The area around the temple has many restaurants such as the Kani-Dōraku, bars and shops that are frequented by visitors and university students from nearby Nagoya University, Chukyo University, Nanzan University and Meijo University.

Video of prayer service in one of the halls

The nearest subway station to the temple is Yagoto Station.

Other temples within the immediate area of Kōshō-ji are Tokurin-ji, Saiko-in, Joshō-ji, Seigan-ji, Kōshin-ji, Hōju-in, and Hansobo Temple.
