= Giuseppe Cerutti =

French-Italian author and politician (1738–1792)

Giuseppe Antonio Giachimo Cerutti (13 June 1738 – 3 February 1792) was a French-Italian author and politician.

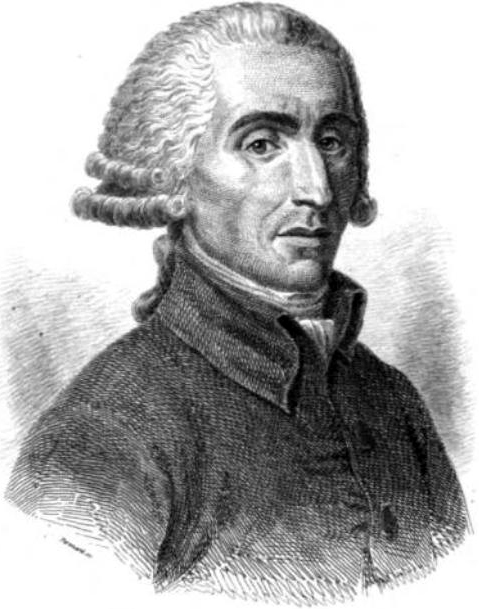
Cerutti published his works in France using the name Joseph-Antoine Cerutti.

== Life ==
Cerutti was born in Turin. Having joined the Society of Jesus, he became a professor at the Jesuit college at Lyon. In 1762, in reply to the attacks on his order, he published an Apologie générale de l'institut et de la doctrine des Jésuites, which won him much fame and some exalted patronage; notably that of the ex-king Stanislaus of Poland and of his grandson the Dauphin.

During the agitations that preceded the French Revolution, Cerutti took the popular side, and in 1788 published a pamphlet, Mémoire pour le peuple français, in which, in a clear and trenchant style, he advocated the claims of the tiers état (third estate). In May 1789, he presided over the electors of Paris, by whom in January 1791, he was chosen member of the administration of the department and afterwards deputy to the Legislative Assembly. He was a friend of Honoré Mirabeau, whose policy he supported and whose funeral oration he gave.

== La Feuille villageoise ==
Probably the largest of Cerutti's literary enterprises was the newspaper La Feuille villageoise founded by him, on 30 September 1790, in collaboration with Jean-Paul Rabaut Saint-Etienne and Philippe-Antoine Grouvelle.

La Feuille villageoise was a highly successful newspaper during the French Revolution. It is unusual among revolutionary journals for having been targeted not at Paris or another large city, but at rural audiences. The paper was extremely influential in much of the French countryside and had approximately 15,000 subscribers in 1791. It was continued by Grouvelle after Cerutti's death.

Actual news reporting played only a minor part in the newspaper's writings: political commentary was by far the primary content. La Feuille villageoise was thoroughly partisan in its republican favouritism and unambiguous in its didactic presentation of its opinions. Less vitriolic and more analytical than many of its more infamous contemporary newspapers, La Feuille villageoise also distinguished itself by rarely identifying individual politicians as enemies of its ideas, but instead relied on a simple trope of aristocrates and patriotes.
