= Kōshō-ji =

Kōshō-ji is the name of numerous Buddhist temples in Japan. Below is an incomplete list:

- Kōshōhōrin-ji, also called Kōshō-ji for short, a Sōtō Zen temple established in 1243 by Eihei Dōgen in Fukakusa, Kyoto; it no longer exists
- Kōshō-ji (Uji), a Sōtō Zen temple established in 1649 in honor of Dōgen's original temple in Uji
- Kōshō-ji (Kyōto), the head temple of the Kōshō-ji branch of Rinzai
- Kōshō-ji, Nagoya, a Shingon temple in Nagoya.
- Kōshō-ji (Esahi), a Nichiren Shōshū temple in Esashi, Hokkaido
- Kōshō-ji (Jōsō), a Sōtō Zen temple in Jōsō, Ibaraki prefecture by the Kinugawa River
- Kōshō-ji (Chikuma), a Jōdo Shū temple in Chikuma, Nagano, famous for its ansu apricots
- Kōshō-ji (Yokkaichi), a Shinshū Takada-ha temple in Yokkaichi, Mie prefecture
- Kōshō-ji (Shimogyō-ku), a Shinshū Kōshō-ha temple in Shimogyō-ku, Kyoto.
