= Bunin (crater) =

Crater on Mercury

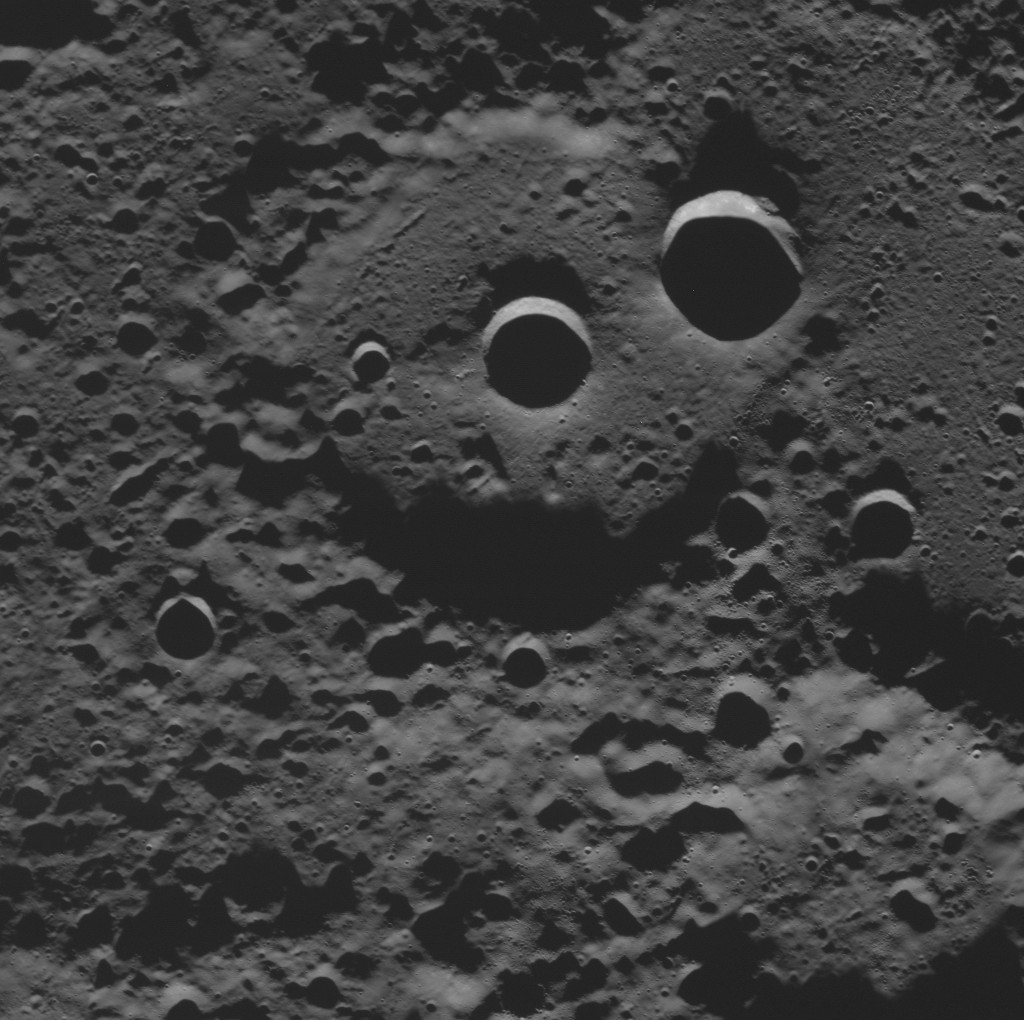
- MESSENGER WAC image of the degraded structure of Bunin
- Feature type: Impact crater
- Location: Borealis quadrangle, Mercury
- Coordinates: 84.47°N 141.76°W
- Diameter: 37 km
- Eponym: Ivan Bunin

Bunin is a crater on Mercury, located near the north pole. Its name was adopted by the International Astronomical Union (IAU) in 2019. It is named for the Russian author Ivan Bunin. The crater was referred to as l7 in scientific literature prior to naming.

The southern rim of Bunin, as well as the floors of two smaller craters at the center and on the northeastern rim of Bunin, are in permanent shadow. Within the shadow of the southern rim is a "small-scale cold trap" where water-ice may be exposed at the surface.

Bunin is northwest of Josetsu crater.
