= Yagoto Cemetery =

Cemetery in Nagoya-shi, Aichi, Japan

Coordinates: 35.1411°N 136.9710°E

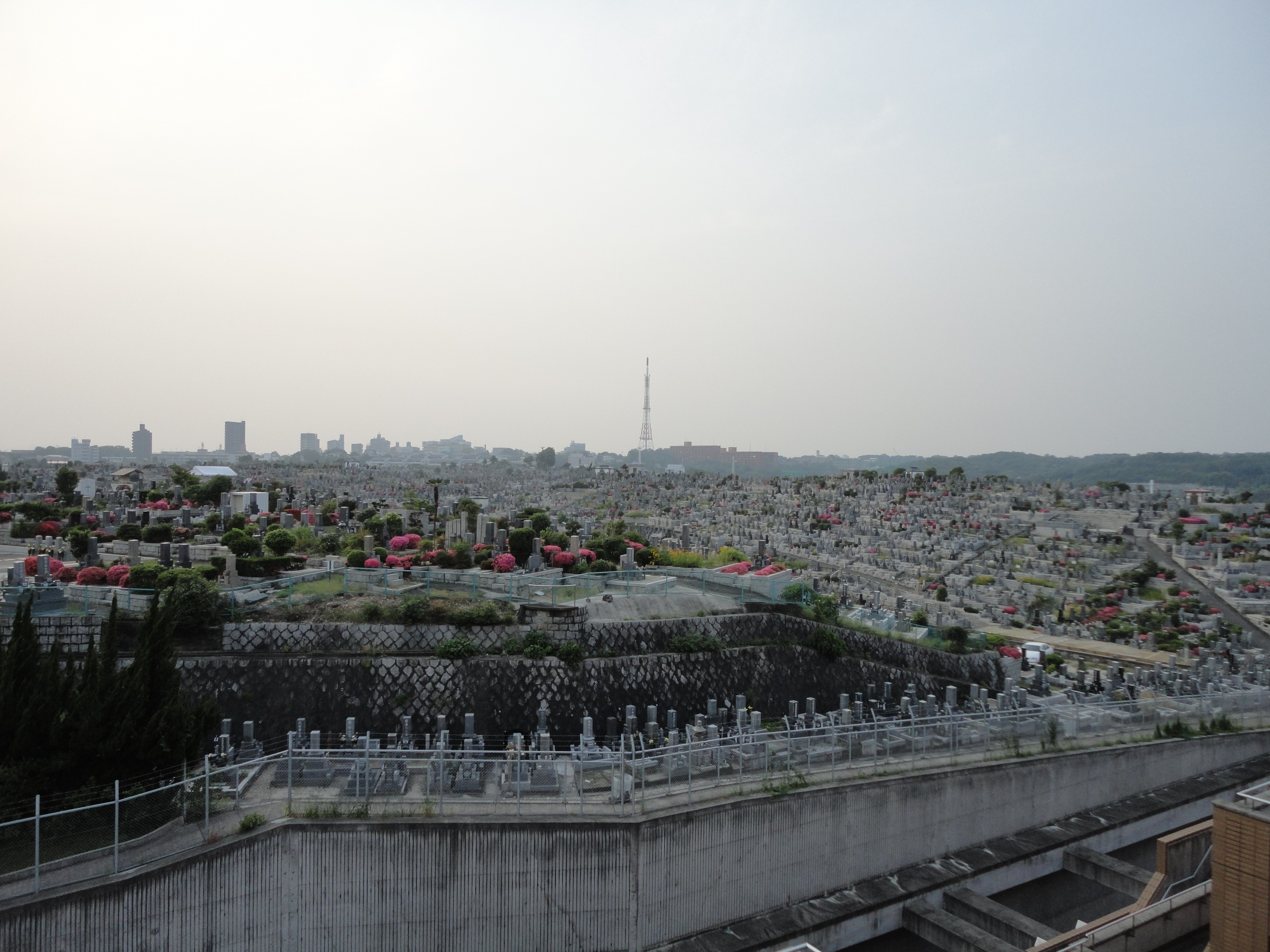
Yagoto Cemetery

Yagoto Cemetery (Japanese: 八事霊園, Yagoto Reien) is one of the largest cemeteries in Nagoya, central Japan. It is located in the neighbourhood of Yagoto.

The cemetery, which was established in 1915 during the Taishō era, is civil in the sense that any resident of Nagoya, regardless of his/her religious orientation, can apply for a space there. The remains of the deceased can be cremated in the crematorium of the cemetery and the ashes laid to rest at the tomb. Most of the graves are family tombs.

Because of the rapidly aging population, there are plans to construct a second crematorium, which has met local opposition.
