= Turgenev (crater) =

Crater on Mercury

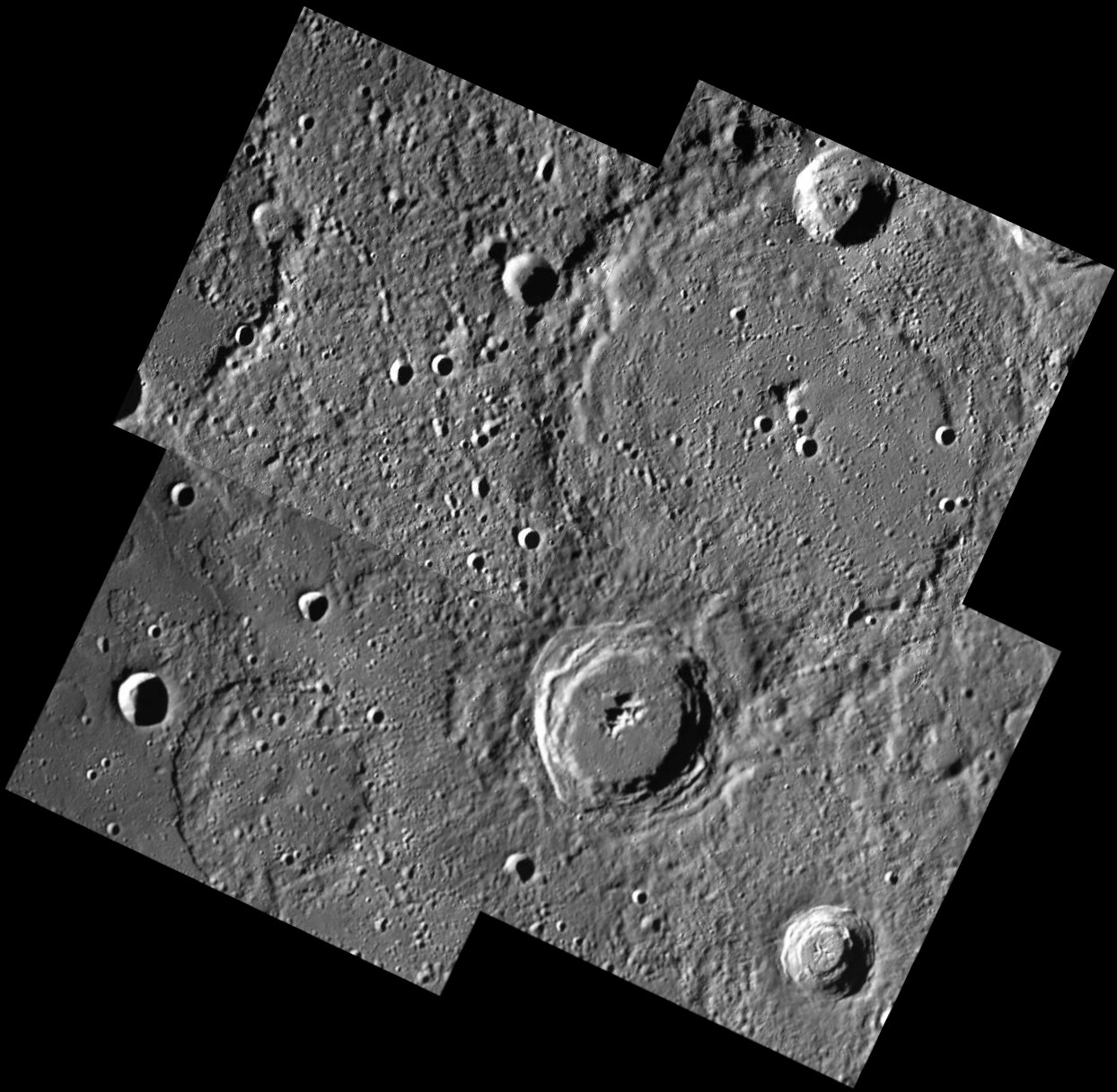
- MESSENGER WAC mosaic with Turgenev in upper right
- Planet: Mercury
- Coordinates: 65.68°N 136.26°W
- Quadrangle: Shakespeare
- Diameter: 136.0 km (84.5 mi)
- Eponym: Ivan Sergeyevich Turgenev

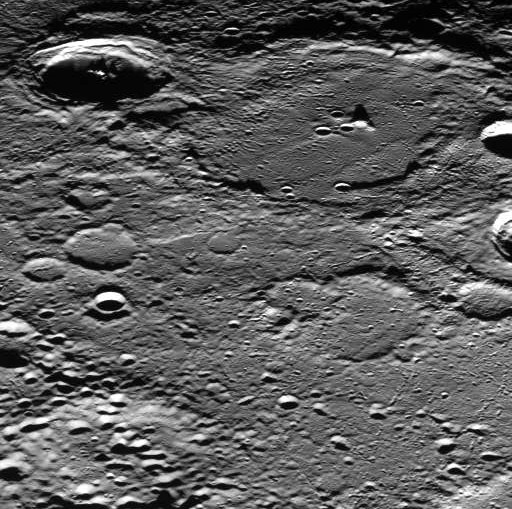
Oblique view with Turgenev in upper right

Turgenev is a crater on Mercury. Its name was adopted by the International Astronomical Union (IAU) in 1979. The crater is named for Russian writer Ivan Sergeyevich Turgenev.

To the north of Turgenev is Jókai crater, and to the south is Kōshō crater.
