= Kōshō (crater) =

Crater on Mercury

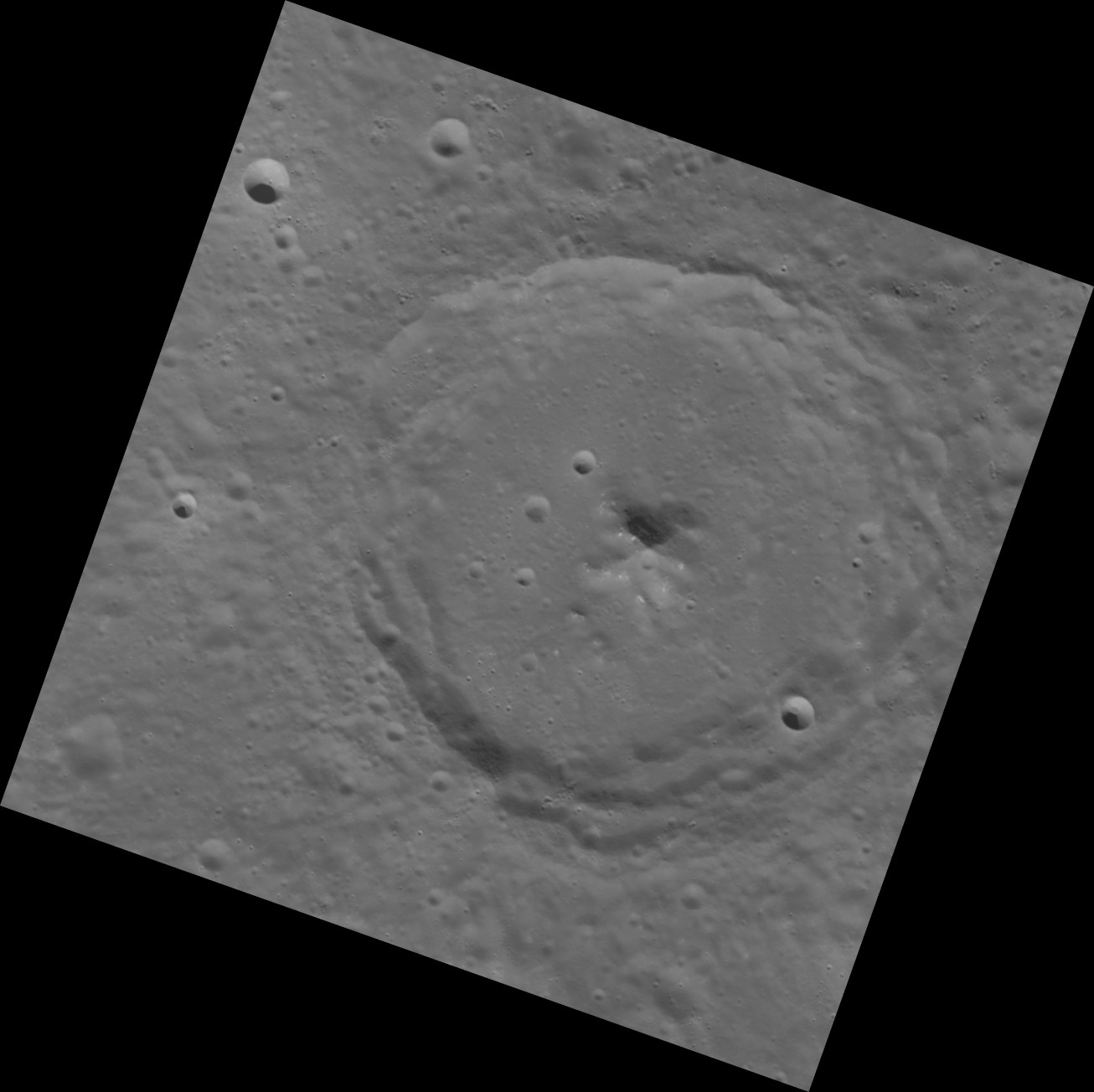
- MESSENGER WAC image centered on Kōshō
- Feature type: Central-peak impact crater
- Location: Shakespeare quadrangle, Mercury
- Coordinates: 59.93°N 139.87°W
- Diameter: 64.0 km (39.8 mi)
- Eponym: Kōshō

Kōshō is a crater on Mercury. Its name was adopted by the International Astronomical Union in 1985. Kōshō is named for the Japanese sculptor Kōshō, who lived in the 13th century CE.

There are bright patches on the central peak of Kōshō, which may be hollows.

Kōshō is on the east margin of Suisei Planitia. To the south is the large crater Strindberg, to the east is Ahmad Baba, and to the north is Turgenev.
