= Josetsu (crater) =

Crater on Mercury

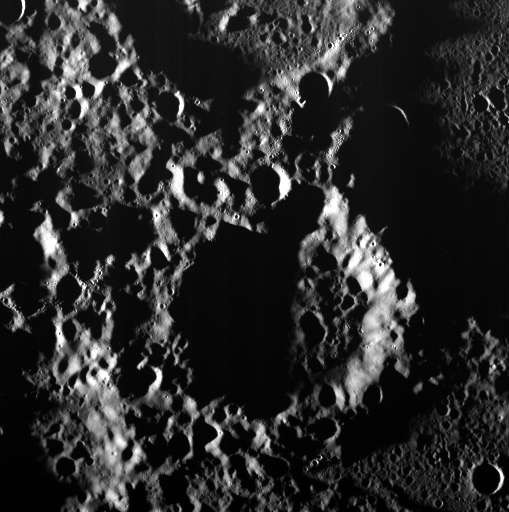
- MESSENGER WAC image
- Planet: Mercury
- Coordinates: 83.58°N 134.93°W
- Quadrangle: Borealis
- Diameter: 30 km
- Eponym: Taikō Josetsu

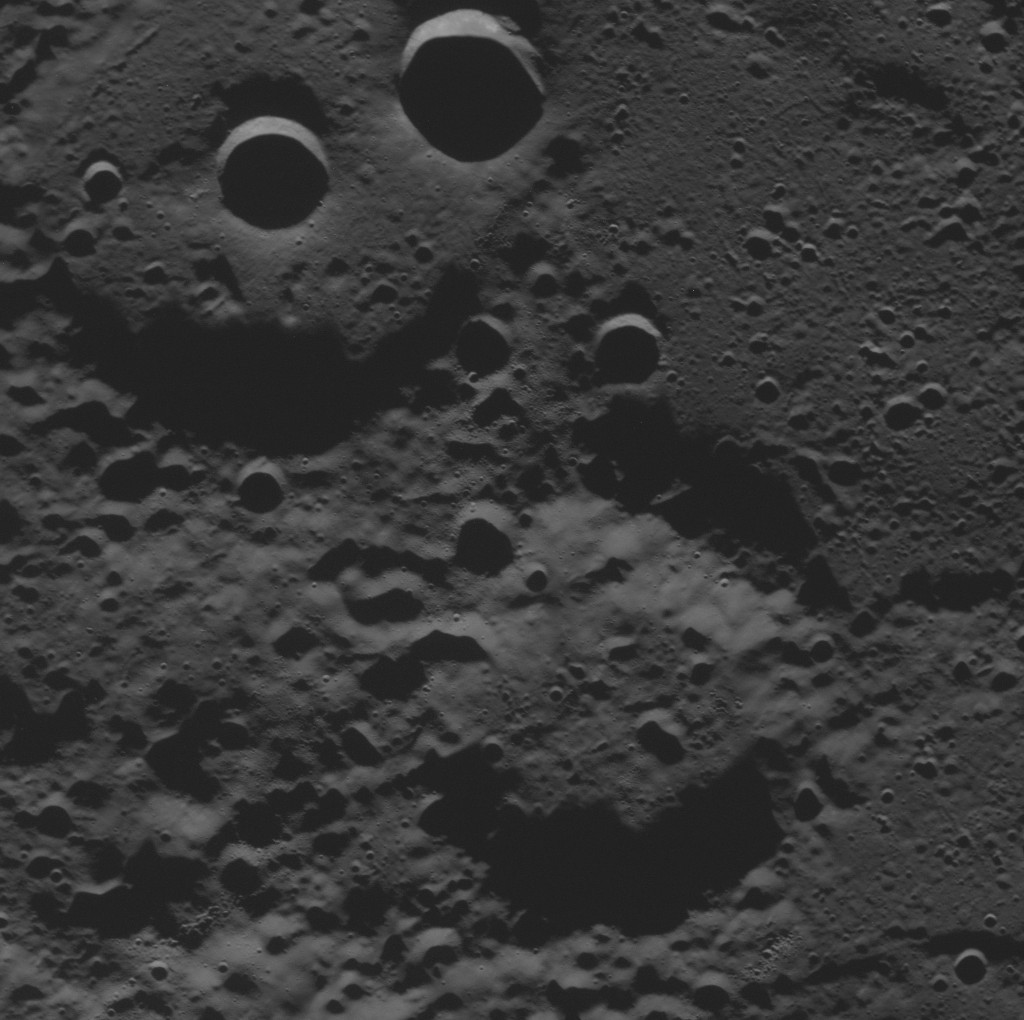
Josetsu crater (bottom) and Bunin crater (upper left)

Josetsu is a crater on Mercury, located near the north pole. Its name was adopted by the International Astronomical Union (IAU) in 2019. It is named for the Japanese painter Taikō Josetsu. The crater was referred to as o7 in scientific literature prior to naming.

The southern portion of Josetsu is in permanent shadow, and within the shadow is a topographic low called a "small‐scale cold trap" where water-ice may be exposed at the surface.

Josetsu is southeast of Bunin crater.
