= Kristoff Deprez =

Belgian footballer

Personal information
- Full name: Kristoff Deprez
- Date of birth: 12 December 1981 (age 44)
- Place of birth: Ghent, Belgium
- Height: 1.80 m (5 ft 11 in)
- Position: Goalkeeper

Youth career
- 1997–1999: Lokeren

Senior career*
Years	Team	Apps	(Gls)
1999–2000	Deinze	11	(0)
2000–2007	Gent-Zeehaven	135	(0)
2007–2010	Hamme	17	(0)
2010–2011	Hoek	0	(0)
- * Club domestic league appearances and goals as of 2 October 2010

Kristoff Deprez (born 12 December 1981 in Ghent) is a Belgian footballer who plays as a goalkeeper, last appearing with Dutch third division club HSV Hoek.
