= Kōshō Tateishi =

Japanese yamabushi (ascetic)

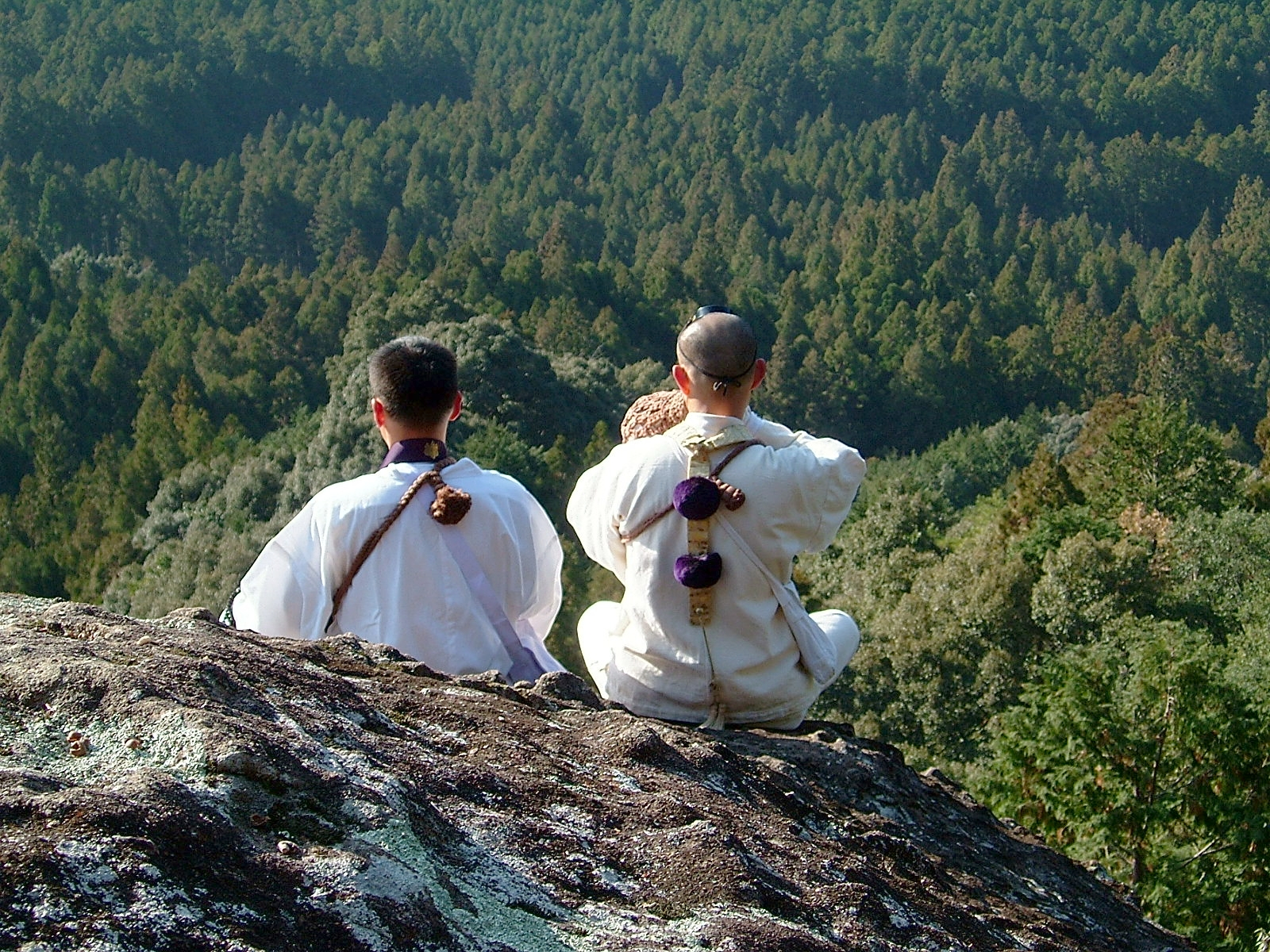
Kōshō Tateishi in Kumano

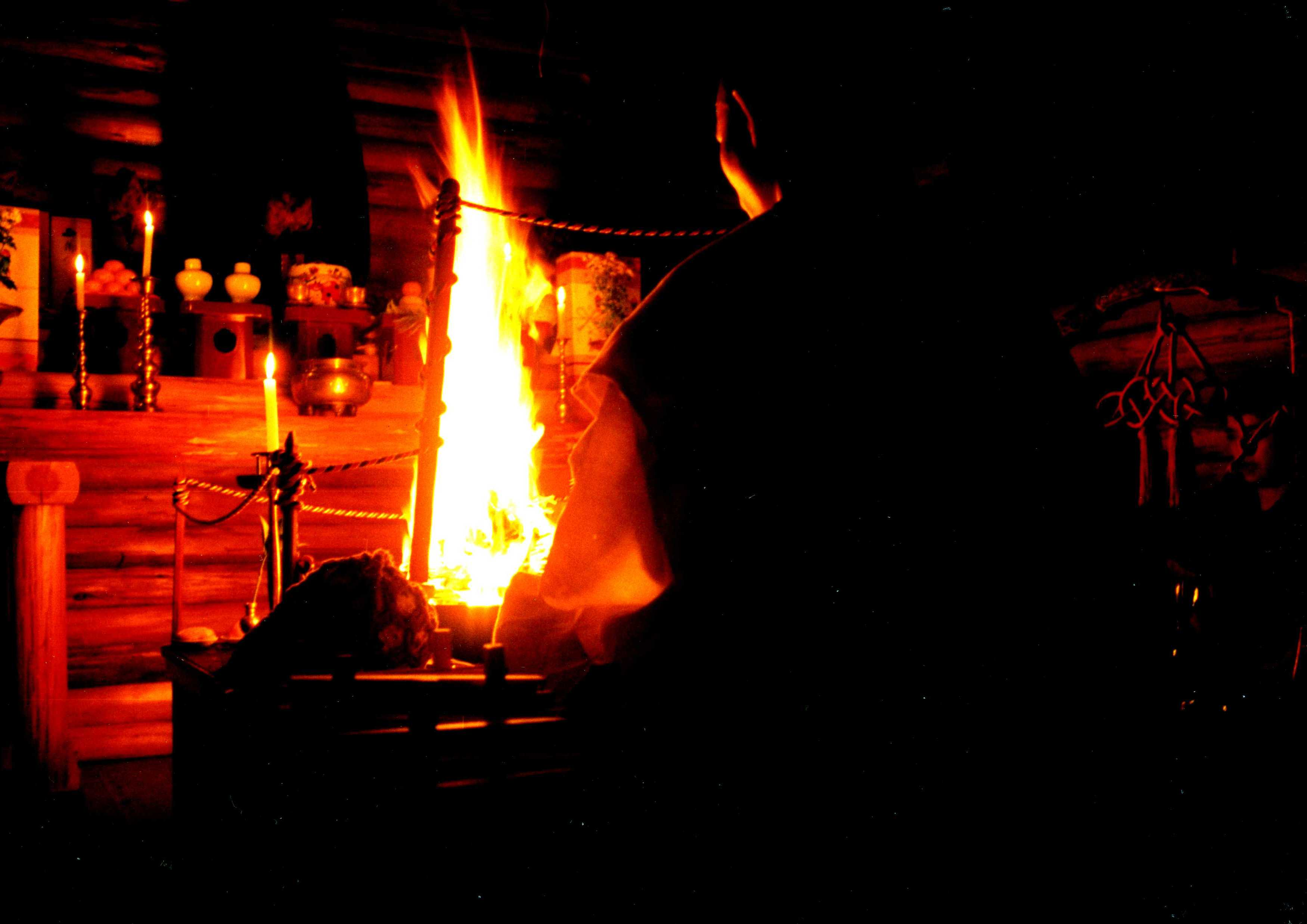
Kōshō Tateishi in Furaisan Shōkakuin

Kōshō Tateishi (立石光正) is a yamabushi (ascetic) in Japan. He trained at the Kimpusen-ji and is an authority on the horagai (conch shell trumpet).

== Authority of horagai ==
He is known as an authority of the horagai which symbolizes the yamabushi. He also holds practice horagai courses at Furaisan Shōkakuin in Kumano on the third Sunday every month, and is trying to promote the spread of the horagai.

== Furaisan Shōkakuin ==
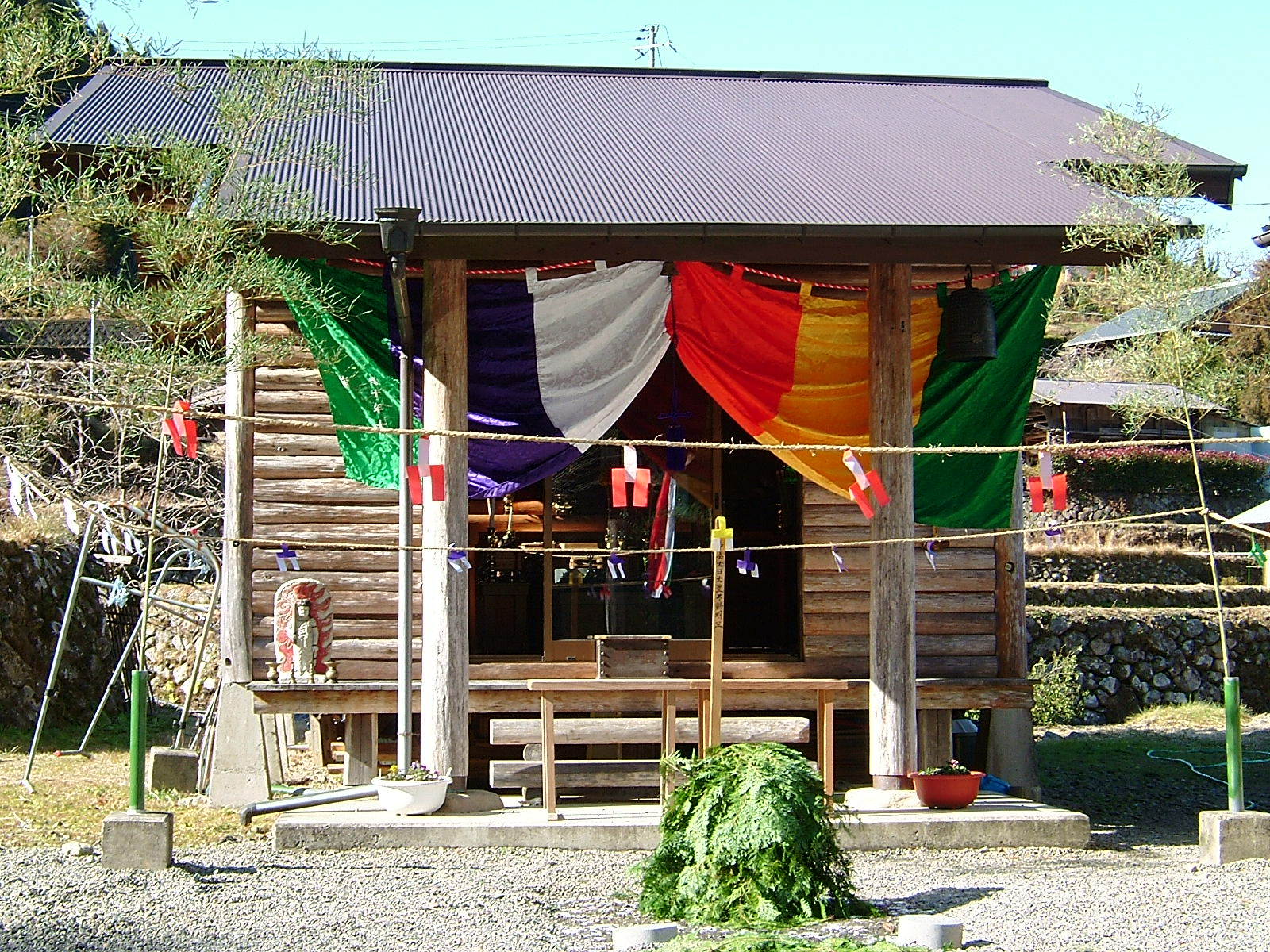
Furaisan Shōkakuin

Kōshō Tateishi establishes "Shugen-Honshu Furaisan Shōkakuin" (a section of Kinbusen temple) in Oyama 1256 Kumanogawa-chō, Shingū, Wakayama to feel the elements and to experience, and trains day and night.

== Sansyu Sangakurin ==
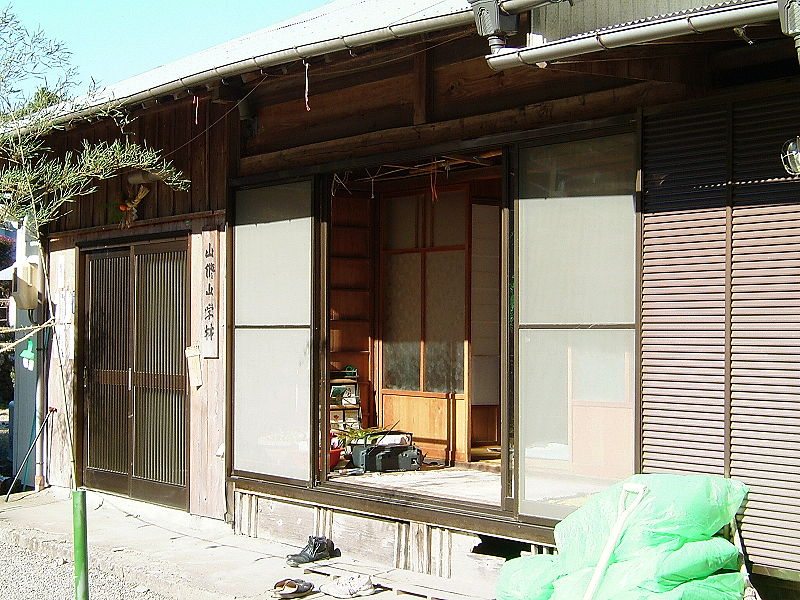
Sanshu Sangakurin

Kōshō Tateishi established a dormitory at Furaisan Shōkakuin named "Sanshu Sangakurin" in the mountains in sacred Kumano where an old Japanese god is said to have lived.

Kōshō Tateishi was published in National Geographic Image Collection.
