= Thierry Maillard =

French jazz pianist and composer (born 1966)

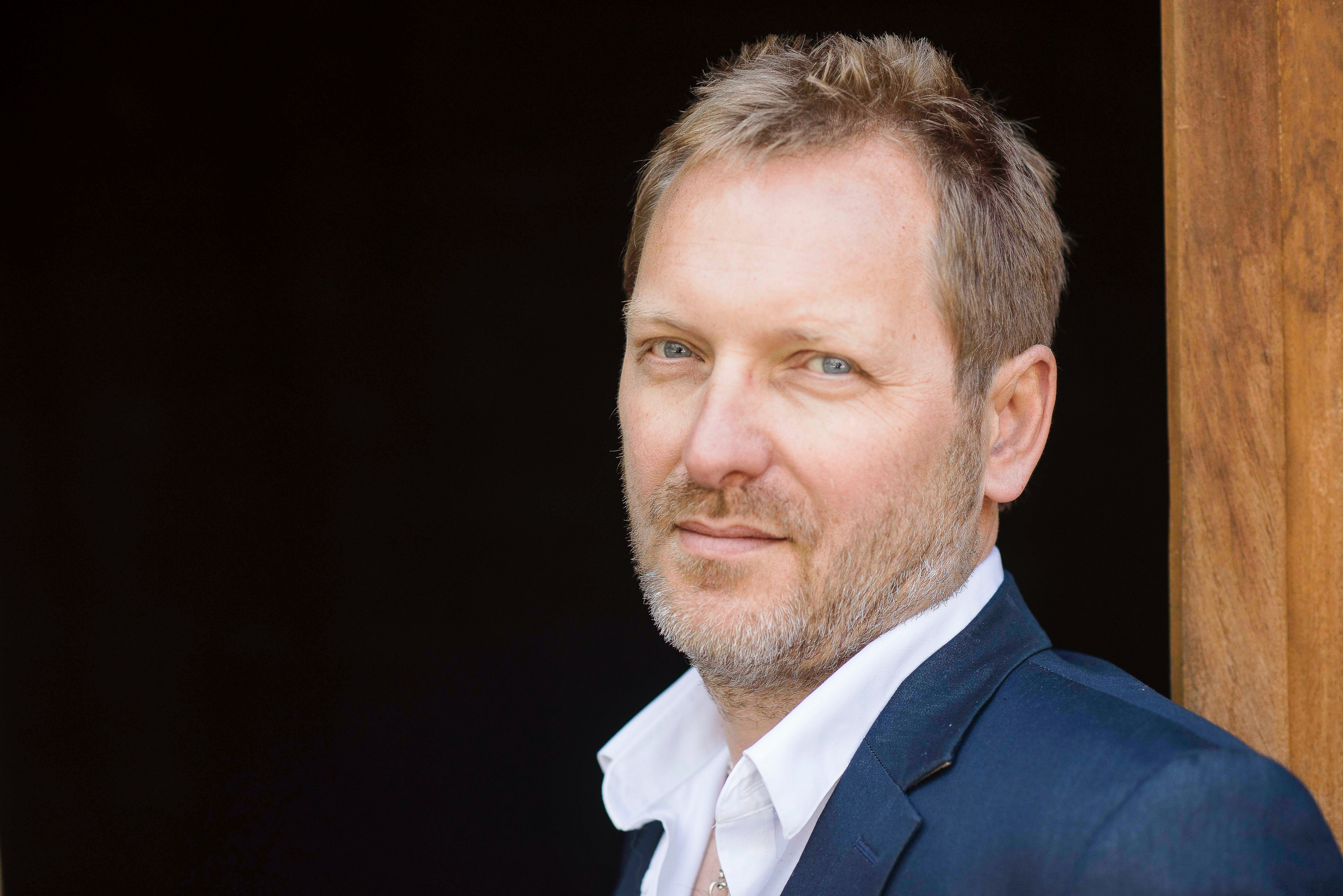
- Thierry Maillard, 2018

Background information
- Born: August 11, 1966 (age 58); Puteaux, France
- Genres: Jazz
- Occupation(s): Composer, music arranger
- Instrument: Piano
- Website: thierrymaillard.com

Thierry Maillard is a French jazz pianist, composer and arranger.

== Early life and career ==
Maillard was born on August 11, 1966, in Puteaux, France. He started his music career at the age of 8 by playing accordion and then playing piano at the age of 14. Maillard entered the École Normale de Musique de Paris to study harmony, counterpoint, piano and accordion and obtained his teaching diploma at the age of 17. In 1984, he formed his first trio (piano, drums, double bass) and composed all the piano parts. His first album Paris-New-York, was released in 1998. Maillard has recorded thirteen albums as a band leader. He has collaborated with notable jazz musicians such as Biréli Lagrène, Dennis Chambers, John Patitucci, Chris Minh Doky, Bobby Shew, Michel Portal, André Ceccarelli, Bernard Lubat, Didier Lockwood, Dominique Di Piazza and Matthew Garrison.

== Discography ==
- 1998 : Paris-New-York
- 2000 : New septet
- 2001 : Time's color
- 2002 : Vision
- 2004 : Entre deux mondes
- 2005 : Héliotropes
- 2008 : Notre histoire
- 2010 : 4 Essential
- 2011 : Behind the Mirror
- 2013 : Beyond the Ocean
- 2014 : The Alchemist
- 2015 : The Kingdom of Arwen
- 2016 : Il Canto Delle Montagne
- 2017 : Alone
- 2018 : Pursuit of Happiness
- 2020 : Zappa Forever
- 2021 : Ballades
