= Chukyo University =

Private university in Aichi prefecture, Japan

Coordinates: 35.138252°N 136.965351°E

- 中京大学
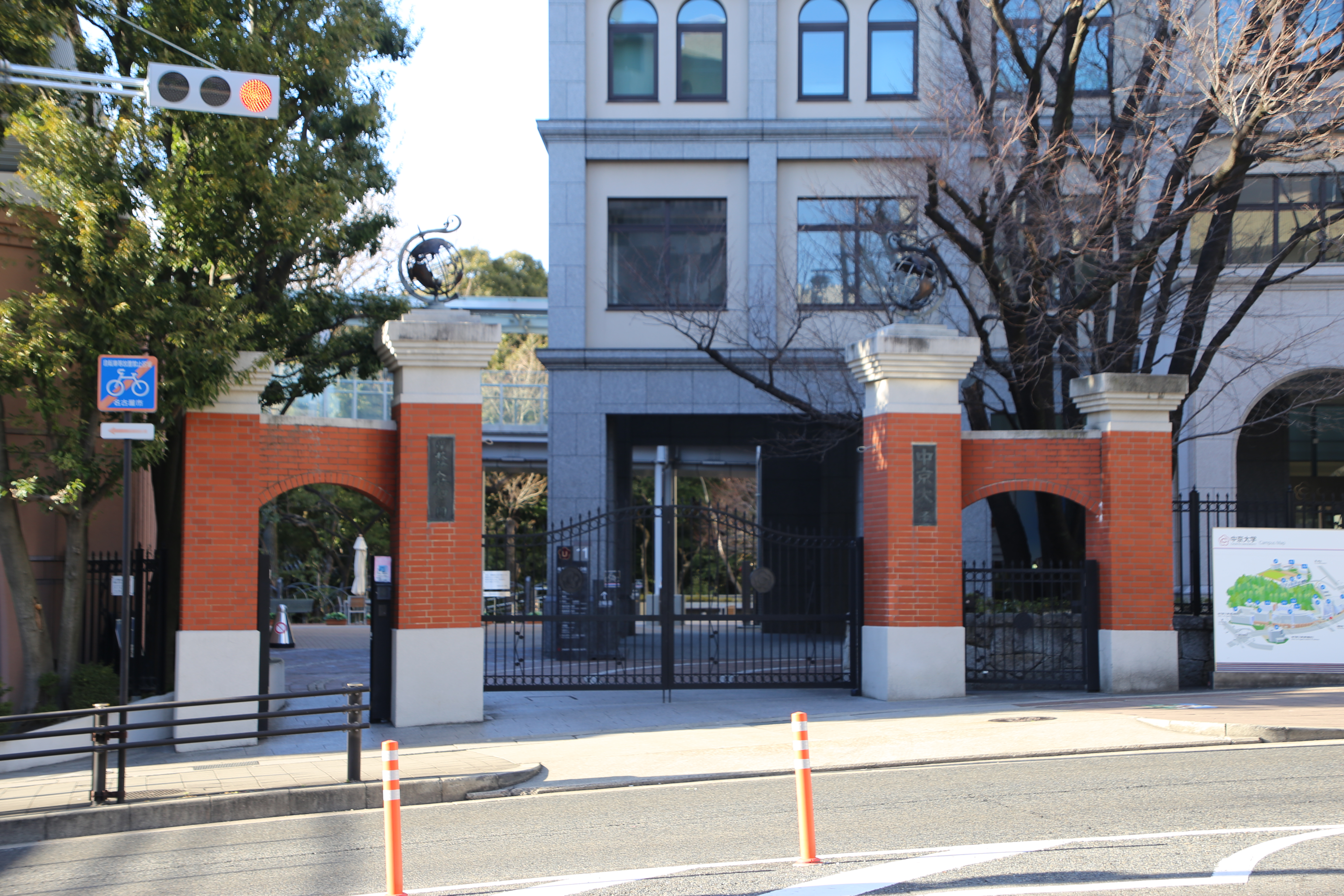
- Nagoya Campus Maine Gate
- Type: Private
- Established: 1954
- Location: Aichi, Japan
- Campus: Nagoya Campus: Nagoya（Shōwa Toyota Campus: Toyota
- Website: chukyo-u.ac.jp

Chukyo University (中京大学, Chūkyō Daigaku) is a private university in Aichi Prefecture, Japan, with campuses in Nagoya and Toyota. The main building is located in Yagoto, Shōwa-ku, Nagoya.

In July 2026, the university signed a partnership agreement with the Japan Sumo Association to carry out joint projects aimed at designing merchandise and volunteering at tournaments.

== Campus ==
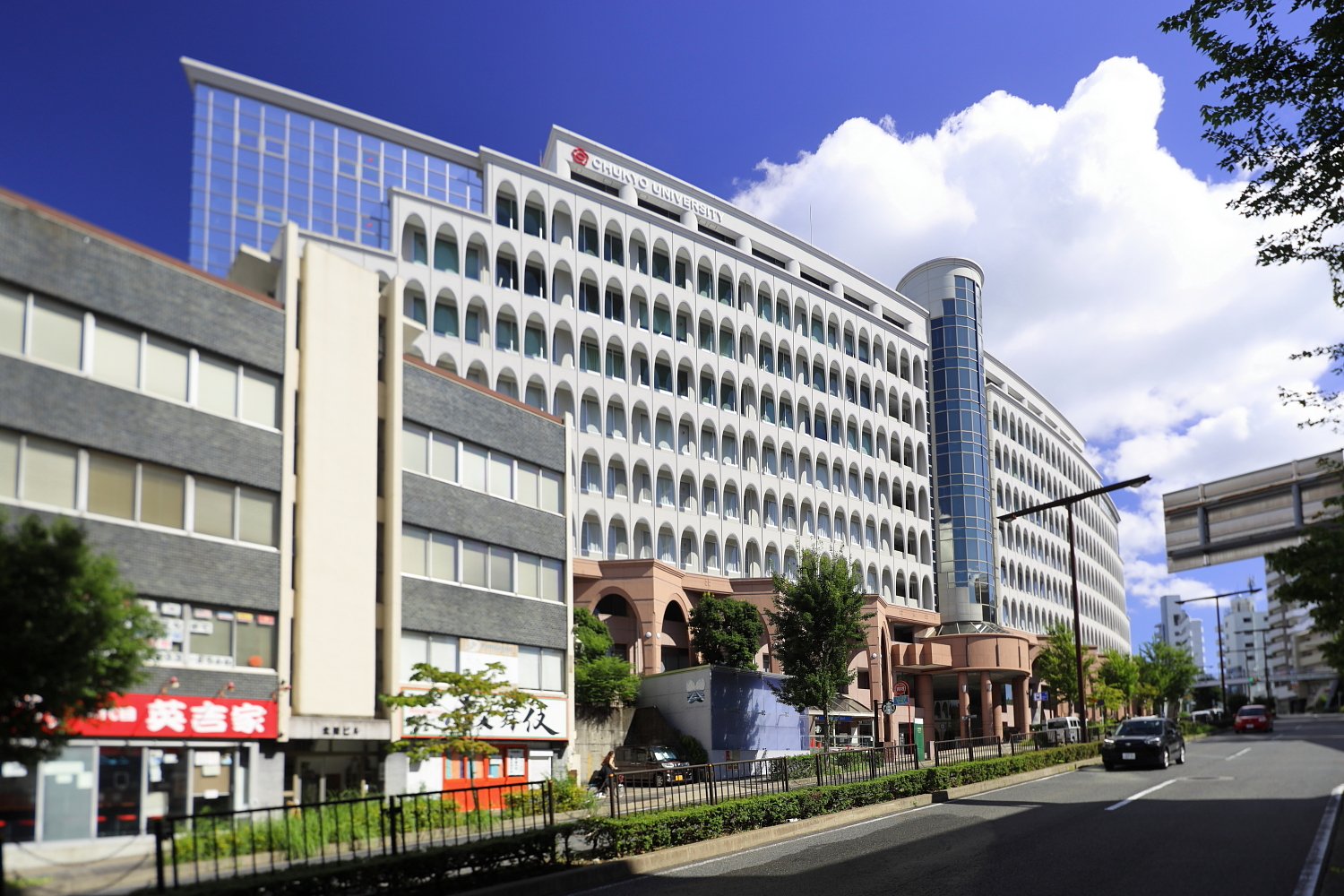
Nagoya Campus

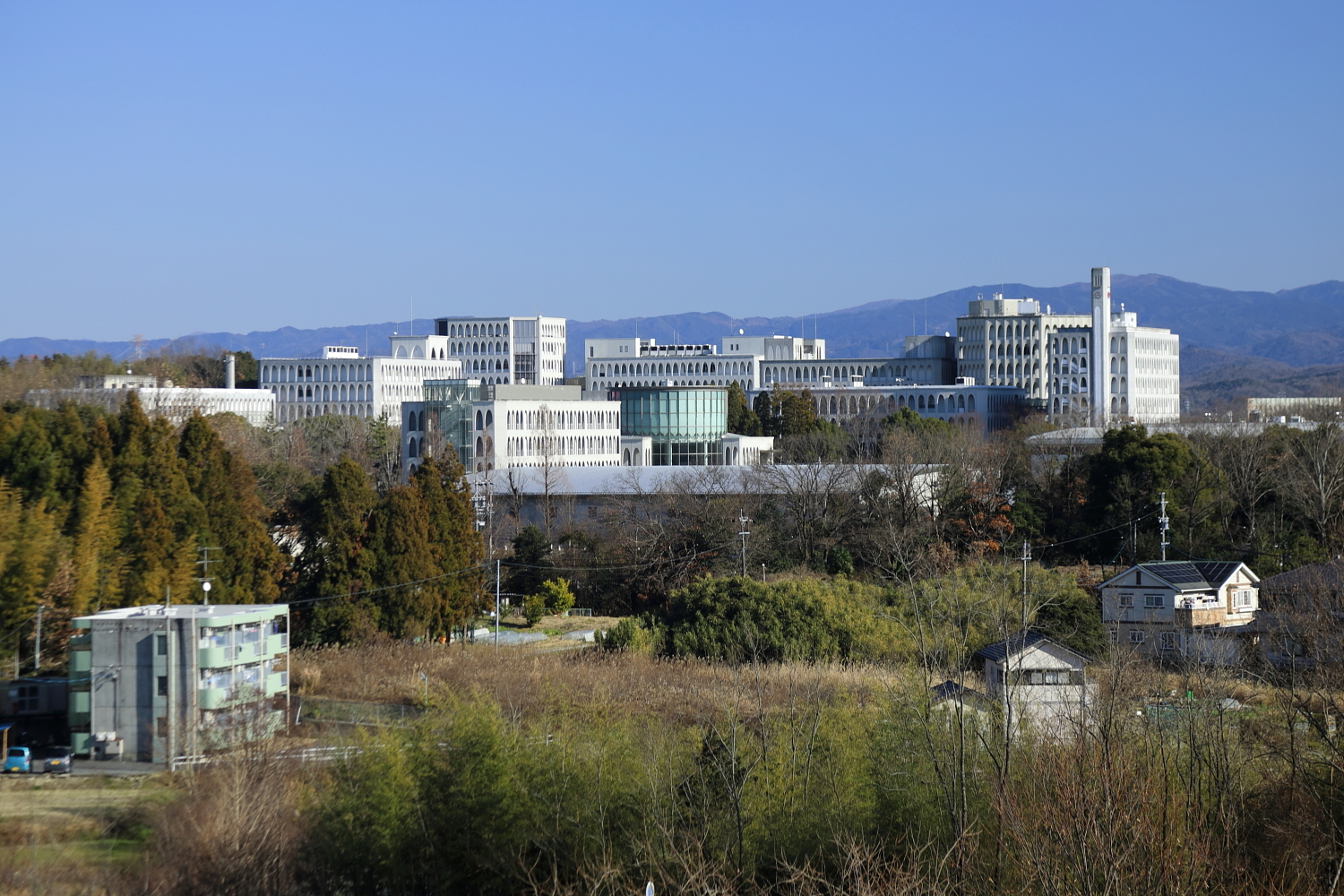
Toyota Campus

== Notable faculty members ==
- Naomi Miyake, cognitive scientist
- Koji Murofushi, Olympic hammer thrower
- Carl Stone, experimental composer and musician

== Notable alumni ==
- Miki Ando, Olympic skater, two-time world champion
- Michiko Aoyama, novelist
- Mao Asada, Olympic silver medalist skater, three-time world champion
- Takahiko Kozuka, Olympic skater
- Jun Maeda, scenario writer, lyricist
- Ryo Miyaichi, Arsenal football player
- Masanari Omura, football player
- Shoma Uno, three-time Olympic medalist figure skater, 2022 World Figure Skating Champion
- Kosei Tanaka, three-division world boxing champion, current world flyweight title holder
- Yuma Kagiyama, Olympic and world silver medalist skater
- Ryuichi Kihara, Olympic and world gold medalist skater

== See also ==
- Chukyo Junior College, in Gifu Prefecture
