= Jean Desprez =

Canadian writer (1906–1965)

Jean Desprez (born Laurette Larocque September 1, 1906; died Montreal, January 27, 1965), was a Canadian comedian, journalist, writer, and director in radio and television. She was known as a Quebecois radio personality and dramatist.

Desprez created the Canadian soap opera Jeunesse Dorée, a particular term for affluent, bullying youth. She had an early role in television in Quebec.
