= Mansart (crater) =

Crater on Mercury

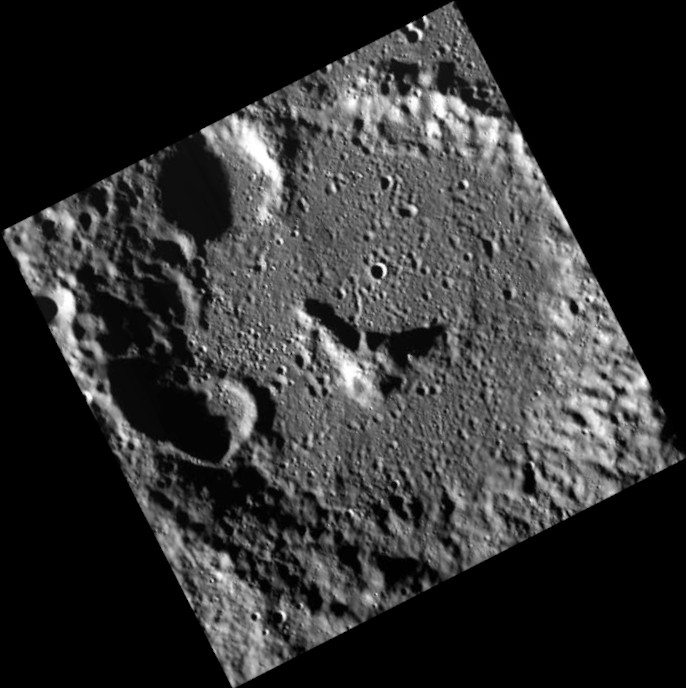
- MESSENGER WAC image of Mansart
- Feature type: Central-peak impact crater
- Location: Borealis quadrangle, Mercury
- Coordinates: 72.72°N 123.36°W
- Diameter: 84.97 km (52.80 mi)
- Eponym: Jules Hardouin-Mansart

Mansart is a crater on Mercury. Its name was adopted by the International Astronomical Union (IAU) in 1979. Mansart is named for the French architect Jules Hardouin-Mansart, who lived from 1646 to 1708.

To the east of Mansart is Bjornson crater, and to the west is Jókai.
