= Despres =

Després, Desprès, Despres, des Prés, Des Pres are French surnames. People with the names include:

- Bernadette Després (1941–2024), French illustrator and comic book artist
- Cyril Despres (born 1974), French rally driver
- Emile Despres (1909–1973), U.S. Department of State advisor on German Economic Affairs
- Fernand Desprès (1879–1949), French shoemaker, anarchist, journalist, and communist activist
- Gregory Despres (born 1982), Canadian murderer
- Isabelle Despres (born 1973), French slalom canoeist
- Jean Despres (1903–1988), French-born perfume industry businessman
- Jean IV. des Prés (died 1349), Bishop of Tournai in France
- Josquin Després (died 1521), French composer
- Julien Desprès (born 1983), French rower
- Leon Despres (1908–2009), American author, attorney and politician
- Loraine Despres, American novelist and screenwriter
- Louise Anne Marie Després (1874–1906), French croquet player
- Michel Després (born 1957), Canadian politician in Quebec
- Pierre Desprès (1288–1361), French cardinal
- Robert Després (1924–2016), French Canadian businessman
- Rémi Després (born 1943), French engineer and entrepreneur
- Sebastien Des Pres (born 1998), American soccer player
- Serge Despres (born 1978), Canadian bobsledder
- Simon Després (born 1991), Canadian ice hockey player
- Suzanne Desprès (1875–1951), French actress
- Terrence Des Pres (1939–1987), American writer and Holocaust scholar

== See also ==
- Desprez (disambiguation), similar surname
- Jean-Baptiste-Denis Després (1752–1832), a French playwright, librettist, journalist and translator
- Joseph-François Couillard-Després (1765–1828), a farmer and political figure in Lower Canada
