= Desprez (actor) =

French actor

Nicolas-Gabriel Poullot (1759–1829), called Desprez, was a French actor.

== Career at Comédie-Française ==
Admission in 1792
Appointed 215th sociétaire in 1802
Retirement in 1816
