= Despréz (crater) =

Crater on Mercury

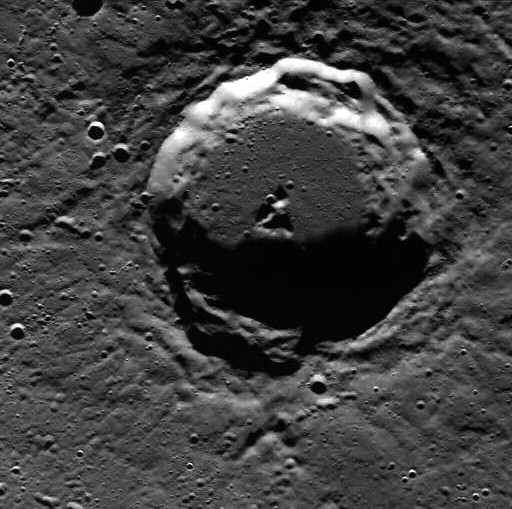
- MESSENGER image of Despréz
- Feature type: Central-peak impact crater
- Location: Borealis quadrangle, Mercury
- Coordinates: 81.1°N 101.2°W
- Diameter: 47.05 km (29.24 mi)
- Eponym: Josquin des Prez

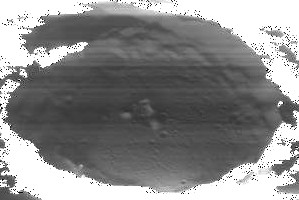
Oblique view of the crater's interior, illuminated by reflected light off the north wall

Despréz is a crater on Mercury with a diameter of 47.05 kilometers. Its name was adopted by the International Astronomical Union (IAU) in 1979. Despréz is named for the French composer Josquin des Prez, who lived from 1440 to 1521.

Despréz has a region of permanent shadow along its southern rim, which has a bright radar signature. This is interpreted to represent a deposit of water ice.

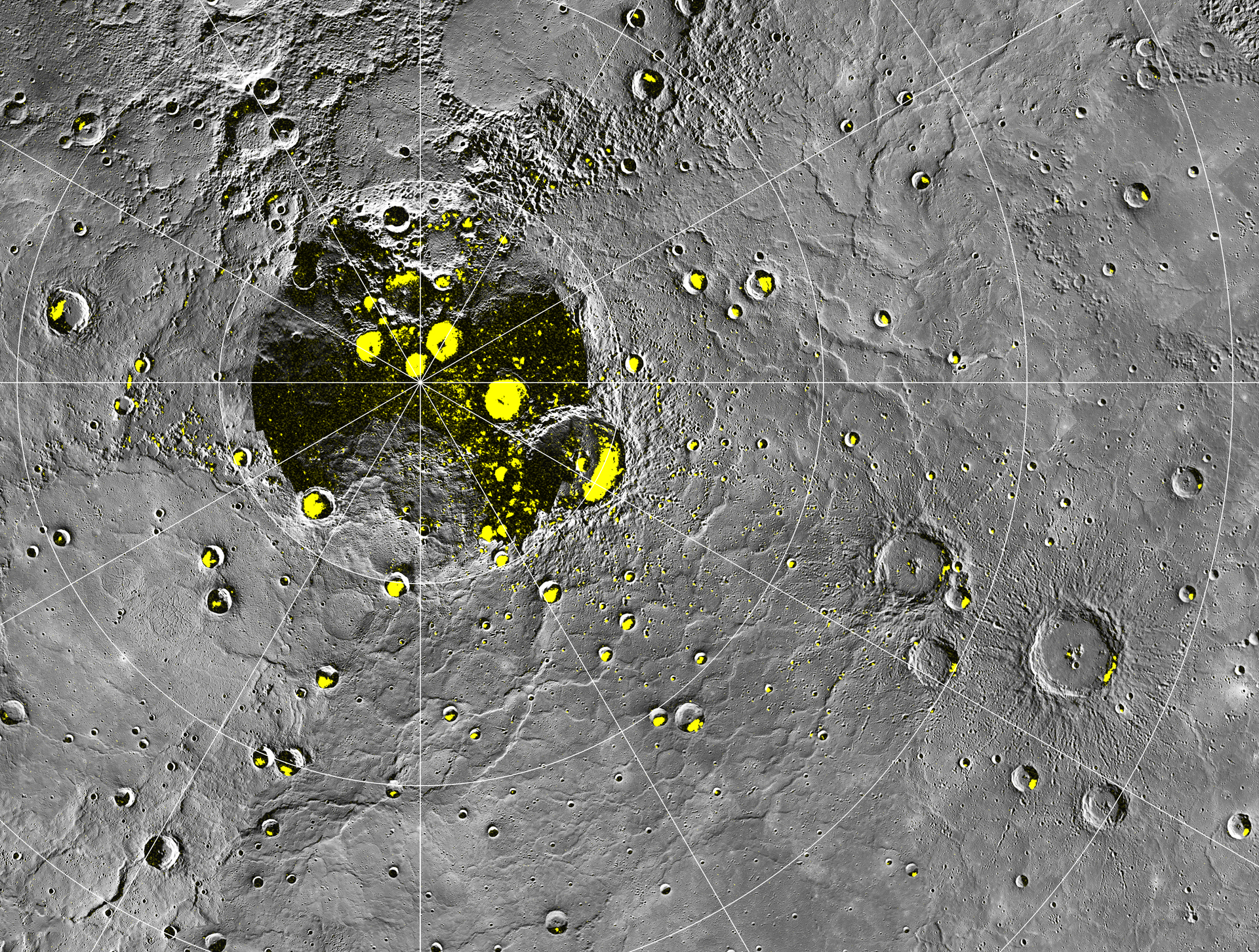
Radar-bright deposits near the north pole. Despréz is at far left.
