= Bjornson (crater) =

Crater on Mercury

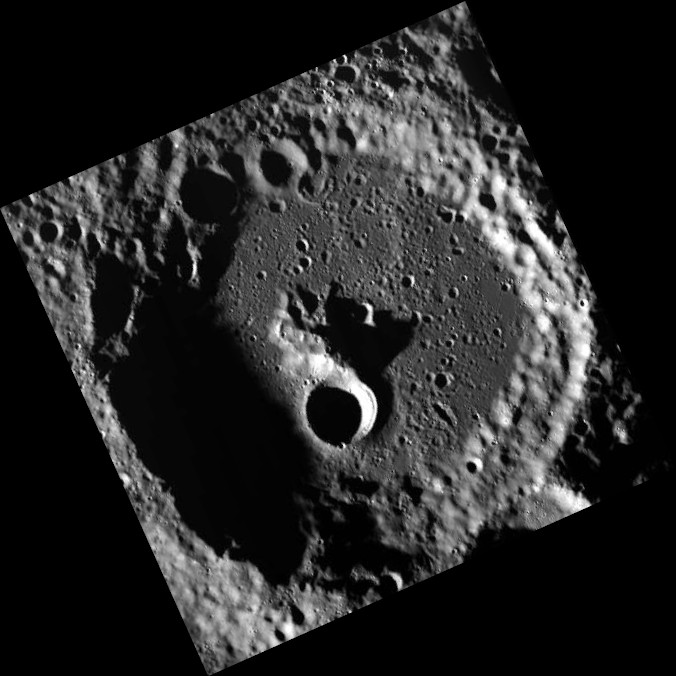
- MESSENGER image of Bjornson
- Feature type: Impact crater
- Location: Borealis quadrangle, Mercury
- Coordinates: 73.11°N 113.99°W
- Diameter: 75.93 km (47.18 mi)
- Eponym: Bjørnstjerne Bjørnson

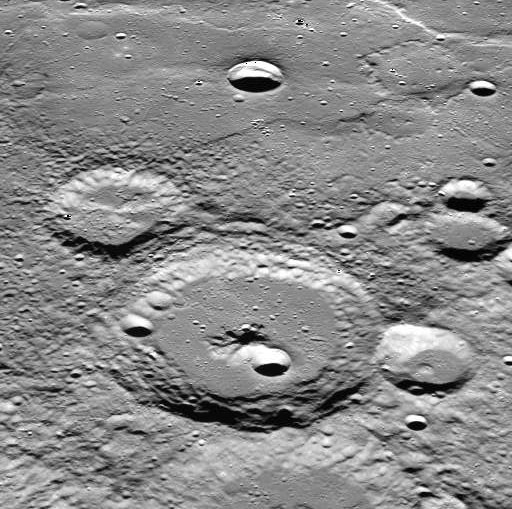
Oblique view looking northeast

Bjornson is a crater on Mercury. Its name was adopted by the International Astronomical Union (IAU) in 1985. Bjornson is named for the Norwegian playwright and poet Bjørnstjerne Bjørnson, who lived from 1832 to 1910.
