= Hayn =

Hayn may refer to:

== Places ==
- Hayn, Saxony-Anhalt, Germany
- Hayn, old name for Großenhain, Germany
- Hayn, Hesse, Germany
- Hayn, Thuringia, Germany
- Jabal al-ʿHayn, Saudi Arabia

== Other ==
- Hayn (crater), a lunar crater
- Friedrich Hayn (1863–1928), German astronomer
- Hans Hayn (1896–1934), German officer and politician

== See also ==
- Hain (disambiguation)
