= Hain =

Hain may refer to:

- Hain (river), a Belgian tributary of the Scheldt
- Hain, Thuringia, a municipality in Thuringia, Germany
- Hainstrasse, street in Leipzig, Germany
- Hain, Ghana, a community in Upper West Region, Ghana
- Hain Celestial Group, a natural foods company
- Repertorium bibliographicum, a reference book compiled by Ludwig Hain, commonly abbreviated as "Hain"
- Hain, the male initiation ceremony of the Selk'nam people
- Hain-Davenant, fictional planet from Ursula K. LeGuin's Hainish Cycle of novels

== People with the surname ==
- Adelaine Hain (1927–2019), South African anti-apartheid activist
- Ludwig Hain (1781–1836), German bibliographer
- Frank K. Hain (1836–1896), America railroad executive
- Edward Hain (1851–1917), English shipping magnate and politician
- Guy Hain (born 1942), French art forger
- Peter Hain (born 1950), British politician
- Uwe Hain (born 1955), German former footballer
- Kit Hain (born 1956), English musician
- Jeanette Hain (born 1969), German film actress
- Scott Hain (1970–2003), American murderer
- Mathias Hain (born 1972), German former footballer
- Stephan Hain (born 1988), German footballer
- Sam Hain (born 1995), English cricketer

== See also ==
- Hein, a given name
- Hayn (disambiguation)
