= Hein =

Masculine given name and family name

Hein is a Dutch and Low German masculine given name, a short version of Hendrik/Heinrich, a derivative surname most common in Germany.

== Given name ==
- Hein van Aken (c. 1250 – c. 1325), Flemish poet
- Hein de Baar (born 1949), Dutch oceanographer
- Hein van Breenen (1929–1990), Dutch racing cyclist
- Hein Bollow (1920–2020), German jockey
- Hein Boele (born 1939), Dutch voice actor
- Hein Donner (1927–1988), Dutch chess grandmaster
- Hein du Toit (born 1926), South African Army officer
- Hein van Garderen (born 1969), South African fencer
- Hein van de Geyn (born 1956), Dutch jazz bassist, composer and band leader
- Hein Frode Hansen (born 1972), Norwegian heavy metal drummer
- Hein Heckroth (1901–1970), German art director of stage and film productions
- Hein van der Heijden (born 1958), Dutch actor
- Hein Heinsen (born 1935), Danish artist
- Hein ten Hoff (1919–2003), German boxer
- Hein Hoyer (c. 1380–1447), German statesman and mayor of Hamburg
- Hein Kever (1854–1922), Dutch genre and still-life painter
- Hein de Kort (born 1956), Dutch cartoonist
- Hein Kötz (born 1935), German jurist
- Hein-Arne Mathiesen (born 1971), Norwegian ski jumper
- Hein-Direck Neu (1944–2017), German discus thrower
- Hein van der Niet (1901–1975), Dutch actor known in Hollywood as "Philip Dorn"
- Hein Odendaal (born 1942), South African medical doctor
- Hein Otterspeer (born 1988), Dutch speed skater
- Hein Pieper (born 1962), Dutch Catholic theologian and politician
- Hein ter Poorten (1887–1968), Dutch military officer in the Dutch Indies
- Hein Riess (1913–1993), German actor and folk singer
- Hein Roethof (1921–1996), Dutch journalist and politician
- Hein Schreuder (1951–2023), Dutch economist and business executive
- Hein Seyerling, South African paralympic high jumper
- Hein Simons (born 1955), Dutch singer and actor
- Hein van Suylekom (1904–1982), Dutch rower
- Hein Vanhaezebrouck (born 1964), Belgian football coach
- Hein Verbruggen (1941–2017), Dutch sports executive
- Hein Vergeer (born 1961), Dutch speed skater
- Hein Vos (1903–1972), Dutch politician
- Hein Wellens (1935–2020), Dutch cardiologist
- Hein-Peter Weyher (born 1935), German Navy officer
- Hein Willemse (born 1957), South African academic, literary critic, activist and author
- Hein van der Zee (1929–1991), Dutch boxer

== Burmese name ==
- Thakin Ba Hein (1917–1946), Burmese politician
- Kyaw Hein (1947–2020), Burmese film actor, film director, and singer
- Moe Hein (1942–2010), Burmese poet and philanthropist
- Myat Hein (born 1955), Burmese general
- Hein Thiha Zaw (born 1995), Burmese footballer
- Hein Zar Aung (born 1990), Burmese footballer

== Surname ==
- Bianca Hein (born 1975), German actress
- Birgit Hein (1942–2023), German film director, producer and screenwriter
- Brandon Hein (born 1977), American convicted murderer
- Carl Christian Hein (1868–1937), American Lutheran clergyman
- Christian Hein (born 1982), German swimmer
- Christoph Hein (born 1944), German author and translator
- David W. Hein, American chemist
- Einar Hein (1875–1931), Danish painter
- Franz Hein (1892–1976), German scientist and artist
- Gauthier Hein (born 1996), French footballer
- Gustavo Hein (born 1972), Argentine politician
- Harald Hein (1950–2008), German fencer
- Harry Hein (born 1945), Estonian military Major General
- Herbert Hein (born 1954), German footballer
- Hillar Hein (born 1954), Estonian ski jumper, Nordic combined skier and coach
- Holly Hein (born 1991), American soccer player
- Jay Hein (born c. 1966), American lobbyist and cabinet member
  - Hein v. Freedom From Religion Foundation the Supreme Court case bearing his name
- Jeppe Hein (born 1974), Danish sculptor and installation artist
- John Hein (1886–1963), American wrestler
- Jon Hein (born 1967), American radio personality
- Jotun Hein (born 1956), Danish bioinformatician, son of Piet Hein
- Karen Hein (born 1944), American pediatrician
- Karl Hein (athlete) (1908–1982), German hammer thrower
- Karl Hein (footballer) (born 2002), Estonian footballer
- Leonard W. Hein (1916–2000), American economist and accountant
- Lucie Hein (1910–1965), East German politician
- Marjorie Hein (born 1946), American lawyer, writer and activist
- Mel Hein (1909–1992), American football player
- Michael P. Hein (born 1965), Northern Irish politician
- Michal Hein (born 1968), Israeli windsurfer
- Neil Hein (born 1963), Australian rules footballer
- Nick Hein (born 1984), German mixed martial artist
- Oliver Hein (born 1990), German footballer
- Peter Hein, Indian action choreographer and stunt coordinator
- Piet Hein (1577–1629), Dutch naval commander and folk hero
- Piet Hein (1905–1996), Danish poet and scientist, descendant of the above
- Riina Hein (born 1955), Estonian actress, director, producer and screenwriter
- Rolland Hein (1932–2023), American literature academic and writer
- Ron Hein (1949–2022), American lobbyist and politician
- Rosemarie Hein (1953–2025), German politician
- Ruben Hein (born 1982), Dutch musician

== See also ==
- Heine (disambiguation)
- Hain (disambiguation)
