= Chŏng Chʼŏl (crater) =

Crater on Mercury

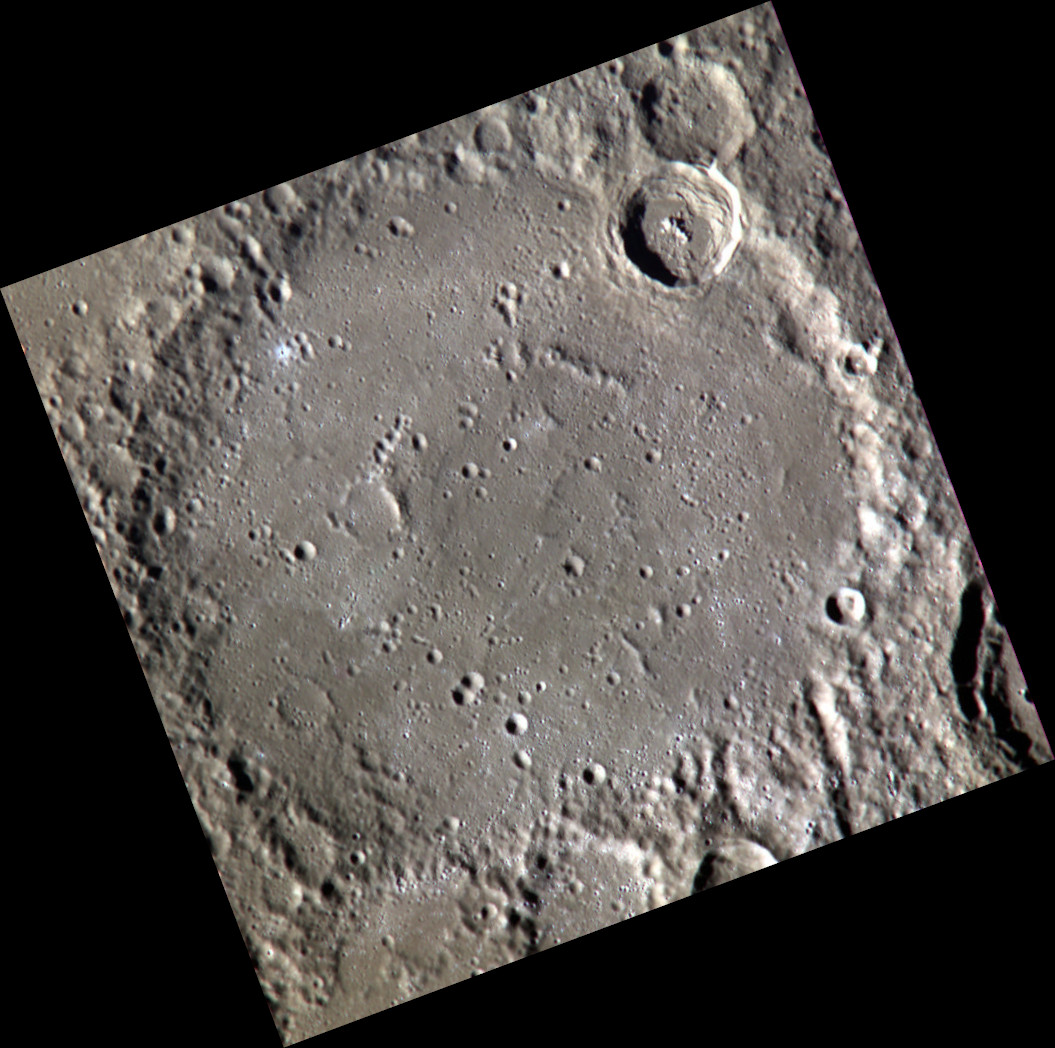
- Exaggerated color image by MESSENGER WAC centered on Chŏng Chʼŏl
- Feature type: Impact crater
- Location: Shakespeare quadrangle, Mercury
- Coordinates: 46.87°N 117.31°W
- Diameter: 143 km (89 mi)
- Eponym: Chŏng Ch'ŏl

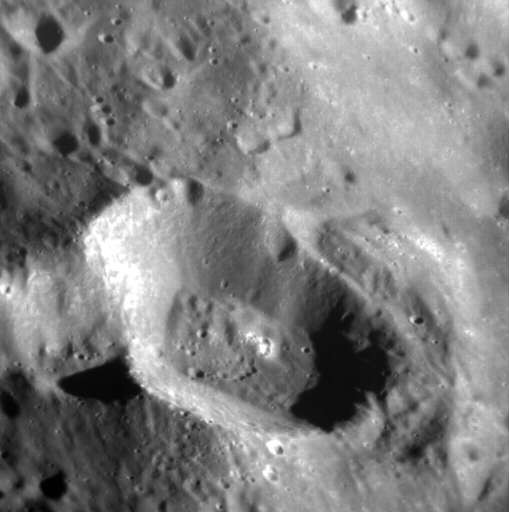
Small crater on east rim of Chŏng Chʼŏl crater

Chŏng Chʼŏl is a crater on Mercury. Its name was adopted by the International Astronomical Union (IAU) in 1979. Chŏng Chʼŏl is named for the Korean poet Chŏng Ch'ŏl, who lived from 1536 to 1593. The crater was first imaged by Mariner 10 in 1974.

Chŏng Chʼŏl lies at the north margin of Sobkou Planitia. To the north is Burns crater, to the northeast are To Ngoc Van and Bruegel, and to the southeast is Whitman.
