= Petermann (crater) =

Crater on the Moon

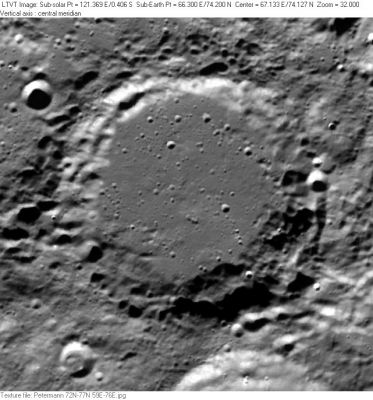
- Clementine mosaic
- Coordinates: 74.2°N 66.3°E
- Diameter: 73 km
- Depth: Unknown
- Colongitude: 296° at sunrise
- Eponym: August H. Petermann

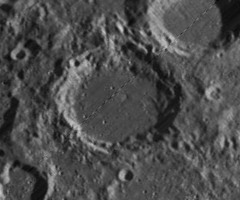
Oblique Lunar Orbiter 4 image

Petermann is a lunar impact crater that is located near the northern limb of the Moon, on the eastern hemisphere. It is located about 10 kilometres to the north of the crater Cusanus. Due to its location, this crater appears significantly foreshortened when viewed from the Earth, and its visibility can be affected by libration. To the west is Baillaud and to the southeast is Hayn.

Attached to the western rim of this crater is the large, heavily eroded crater Petermann R, which is much larger than Petermann although less prominent in appearance. The outer rim of Petermann is eroded, but retains some structure including traces of terraces. The inner wall varies in width around the perimeter, being wider to the south and southeast near Cusanus. The interior floor has been resurfaced, leaving a level plain that is marked only by a number of tiny craterlets and only a few low ridges near the sides.

The name of the crater was approved by the IAU in 1935.

== Satellite craters ==
By convention these features are identified on lunar maps by placing the letter on the side of the crater midpoint that is closest to Petermann.

Petermann	Latitude	Longitude	Diameter
A	75.0° N	87.1° E	17 km
B	72.8° N	63.8° E	11 km
C	71.6° N	57.7° E	13 km
D	77.1° N	65.8° E	31 km
E	72.5° N	53.7° E	13 km
R	75.0° N	56.7° E	115 km
S	75.2° N	61.9° E	8 km
X	75.1° N	73.3° E	9 km
Y	76.0° N	87.4° E	13 km
