= Heine (crater) =

Crater on Mercury

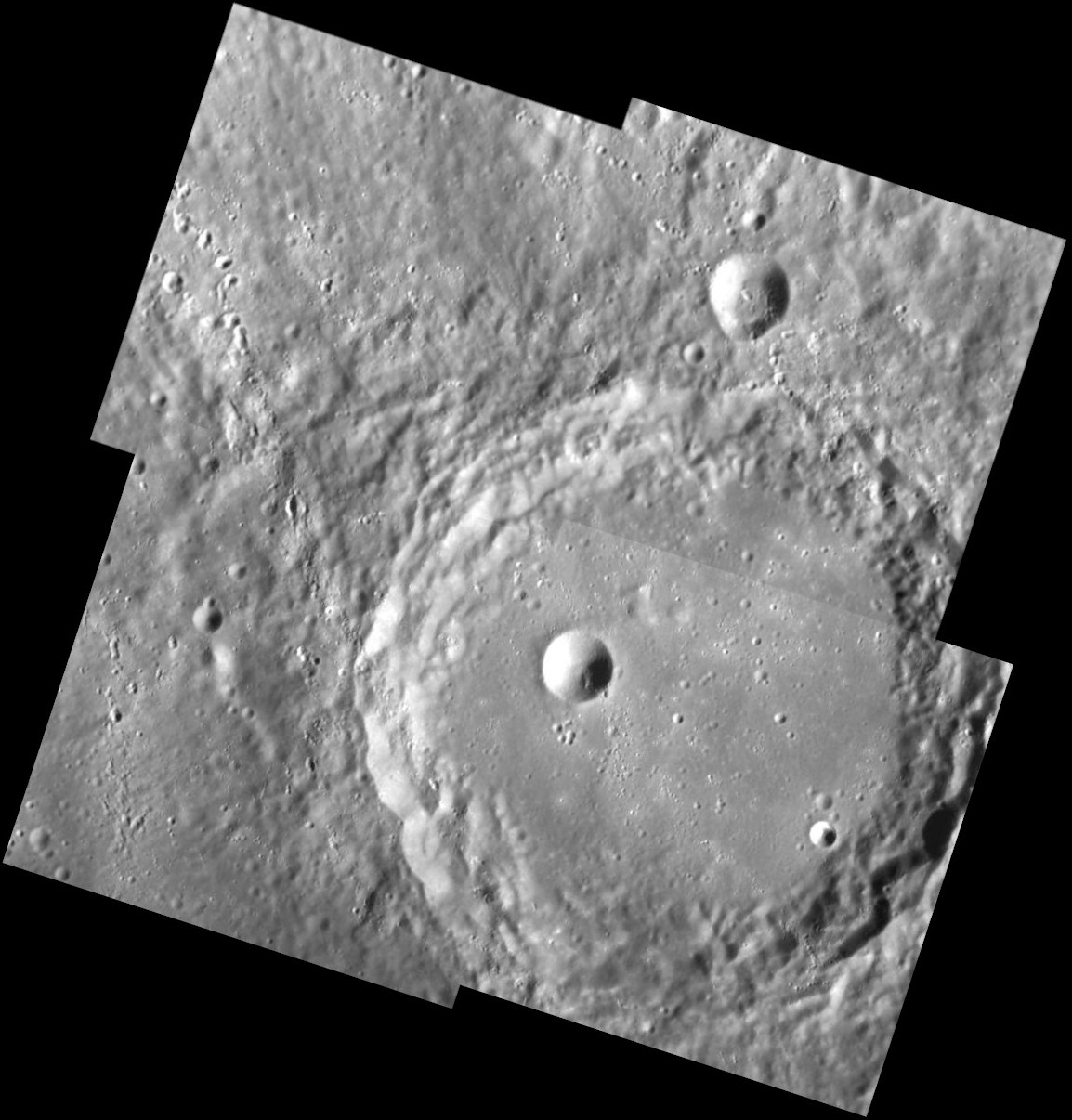
- MESSENGER NAC mosaic of Heine
- Feature type: Impact crater
- Location: Shakespeare quadrangle, Mercury
- Coordinates: 32.46°N 124.88°W
- Diameter: 73 km (45 mi)
- Eponym: Heinrich Heine

Heine is a crater on Mercury. Its name was adopted by the International Astronomical Union (IAU) in 1979. Heine is named for the German poet Heinrich Heine, who lived from 1797 to 1856. The crater was first imaged by Mariner 10 in 1974.

Heine crater is to the southeast of the prominent Degas crater, and is overlain by rays and secondary craters from Degas. Heine is on the southwestern margin of Sobkou Planitia.

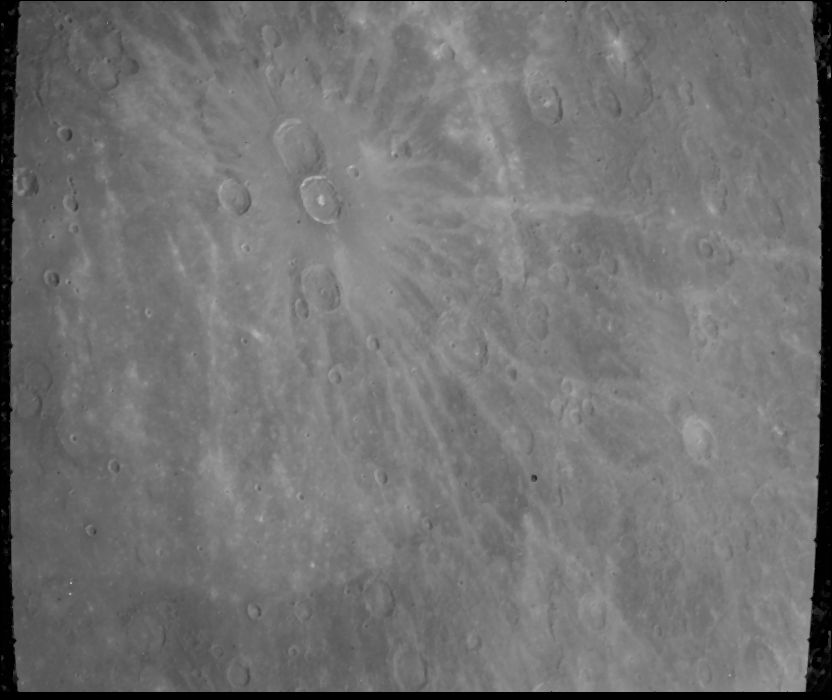
Mariner 10 image with Heine near center and Degas in upper left
