= Heine (disambiguation) =

Heine is a surname and a given name.

Heine may also refer to:

- Heine (crater), a crater on Mercury
- Mount Heine, a hill on White Island, Ross Archipelago, Antarctica
- Heine, German name for Kolejka, Opole Voivodeship, a village in Poland

== See also ==
- Heine Brothers', an American chain of coffee shops
- Heine Optotechnik, a German manufacturer of medical diagnostic instruments
- Heine Prize, three different German awards in honor of Heinrich Heine
- Heine-Velox, a large luxury car made in the early 20th century
