= To Ngoc Van =

To Ngoc Van may refer to:

- To Ngoc Van, a pit-floored crater on Mercury.
- Tô Ngọc Vân, a Vietnamese painter.
