= Brontë (Mercurian crater) =

Crater on Mercury

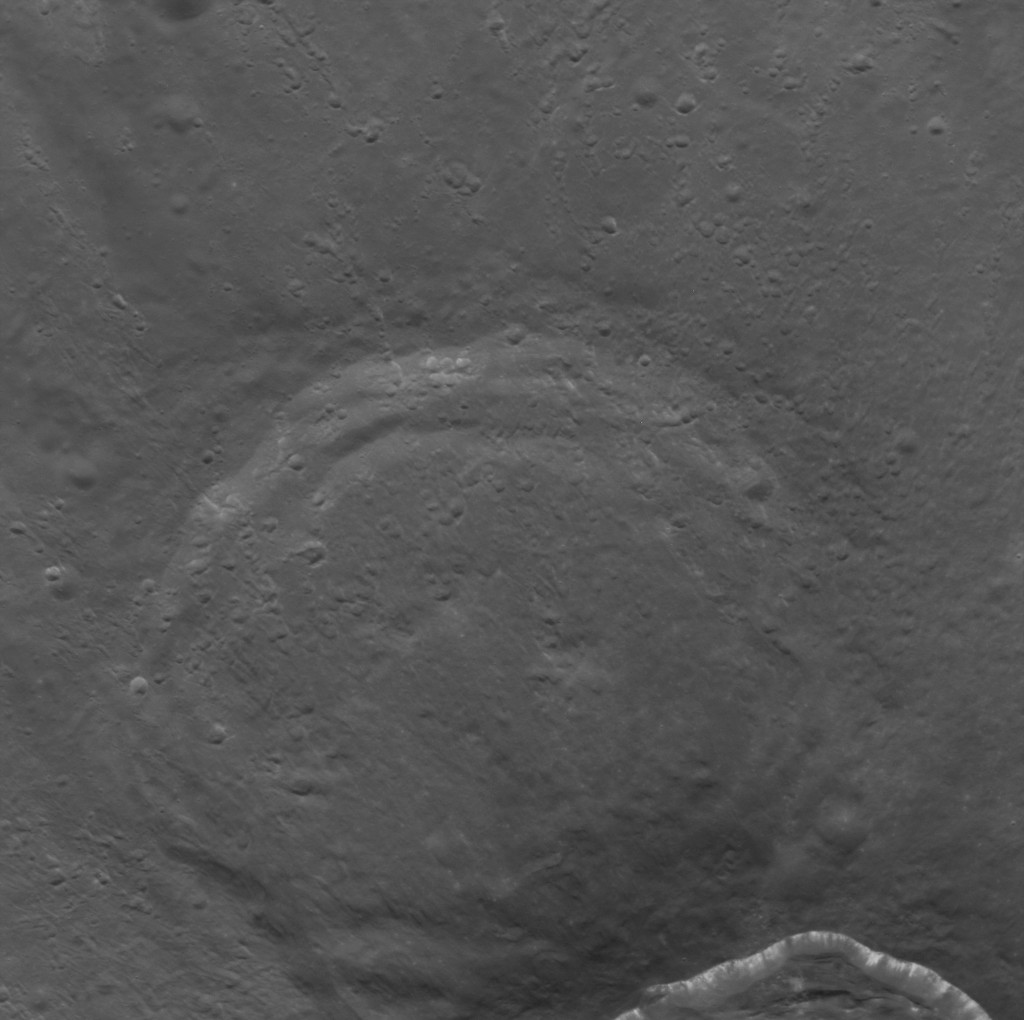
- MESSENGER WAC of Brontë
- Feature type: Impact crater
- Location: Shakespeare quadrangle, Mercury
- Coordinates: 38.4°N 127.1°W
- Diameter: 68 km (42 mi)
- Eponym: Charlotte Brontë, Emily Brontë, Anne Brontë, Branwell Brontë

Brontë is a crater on Mercury. It has a diameter of 68 kilometres (42 miles). Its name was adopted by the International Astronomical Union in 1976. Bronte is named for English writers Charlotte Brontë, who lived from 1816 to 1855, Emily Brontë, who lived from 1818 to 1848, and Anne Brontë, who lived from 1820 to 1849, and English writer and artist Branwell Brontë, who lived from 1817 to 1848. The crater was first imaged by Mariner 10 in 1974.

Brontë forms a crater pair with Degas immediately to the south. Brontë is covered with ejecta and secondary craters from the much younger Degas. Both craters lie within Sobkou Planitia.

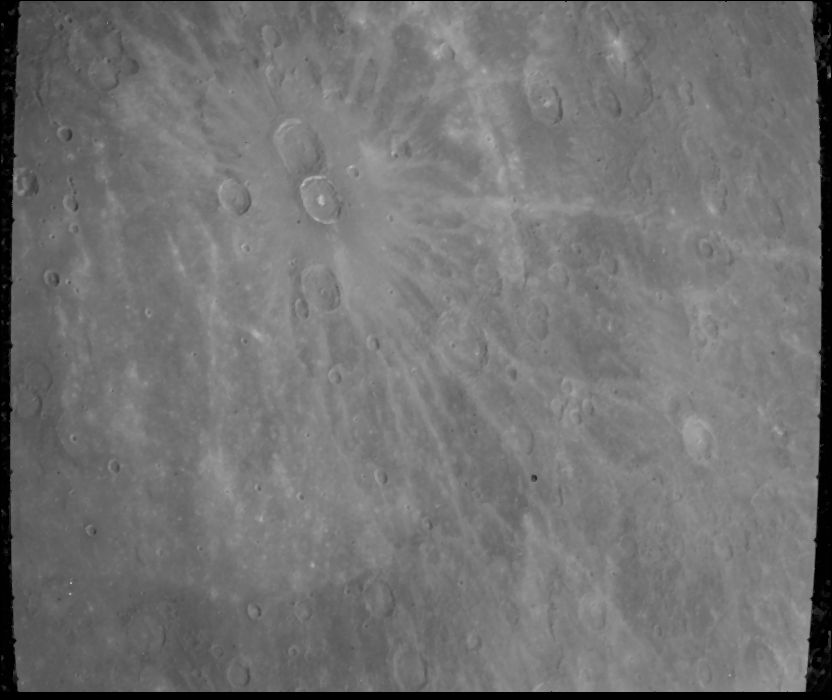
Mariner 10 image

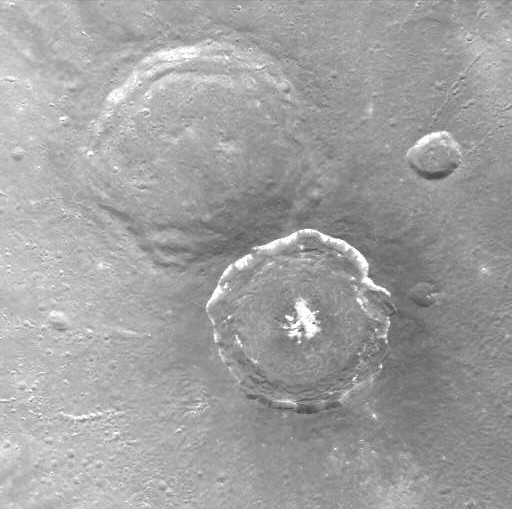
Degas and Brontë craters

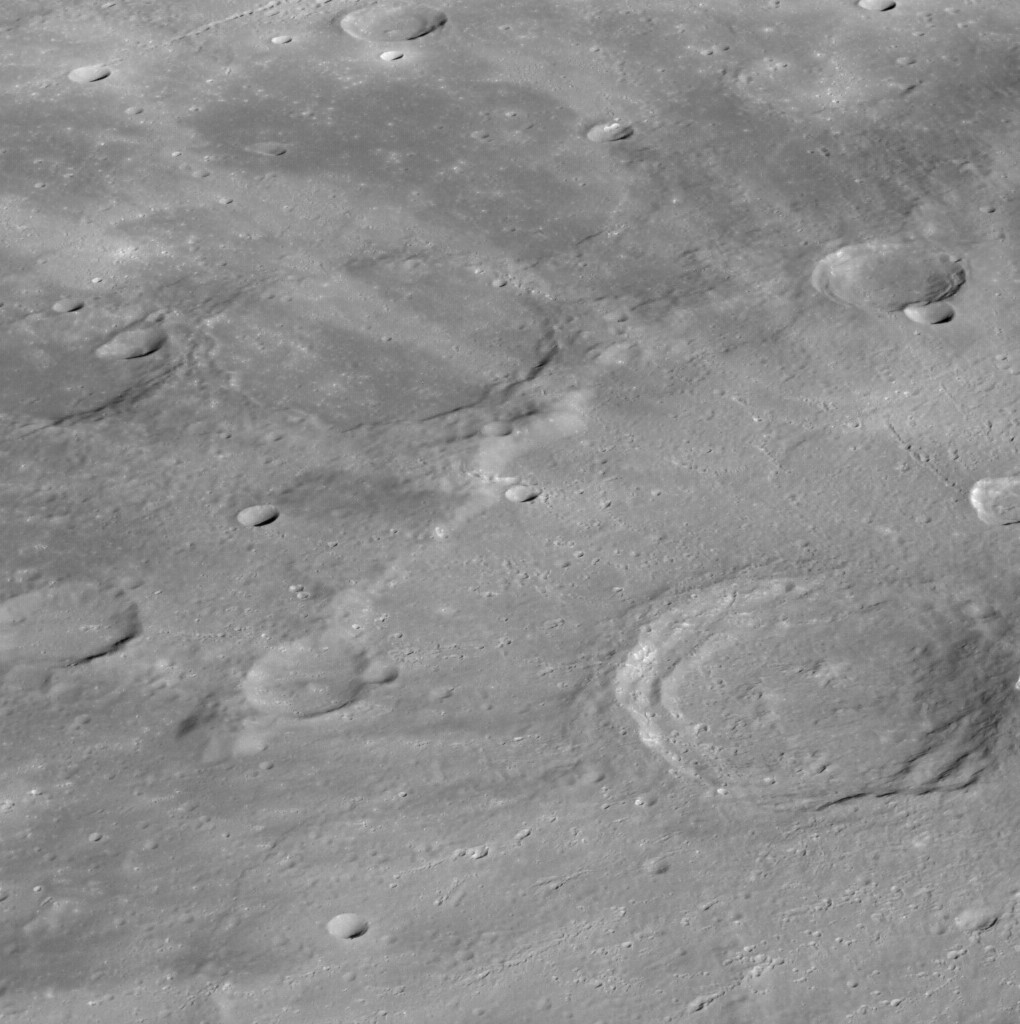
Oblique view of Brontë at right with prominent scarp above and to the left of it
