= Whitman (crater) =

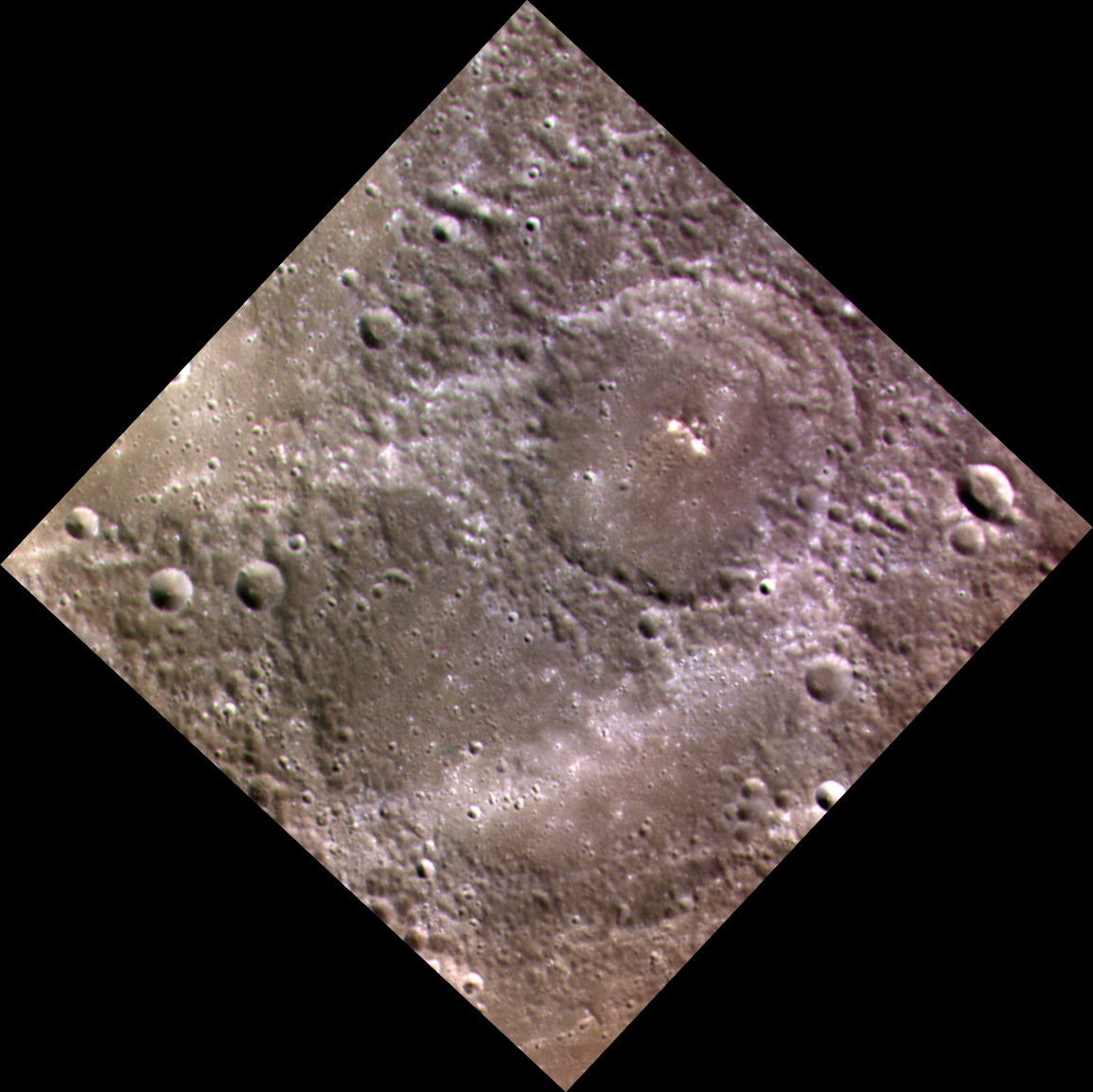
- Exaggerated color MESSENGER image with Whitman in upper right
- Planet: Mercury
- Coordinates: 41.4°N 111.64°W
- Quadrangle: Shakespeare
- Diameter: 64 km (40 mi)
- Eponym: Walt Whitman

Whitman is a crater on Mercury. Its name was adopted by the International Astronomical Union (IAU) in 1985. Whitman is named for American poet Walt Whitman. The crater was first imaged by Mariner 10 in 1974.

The central peak complex of Whitman has bright spots on it which may be hollows.

To the south of Whitman is Gibran crater, and to the southwest is Damer. The large crater Scarlatti is to the east, and Chŏng Chʼŏl is to the northwest.

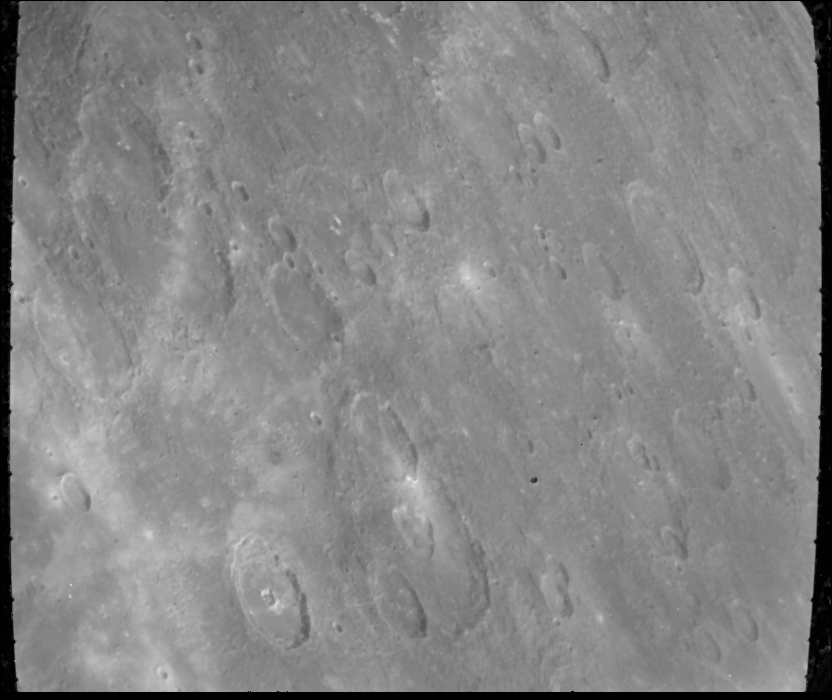
Mariner 10 image with Whitman in upper left

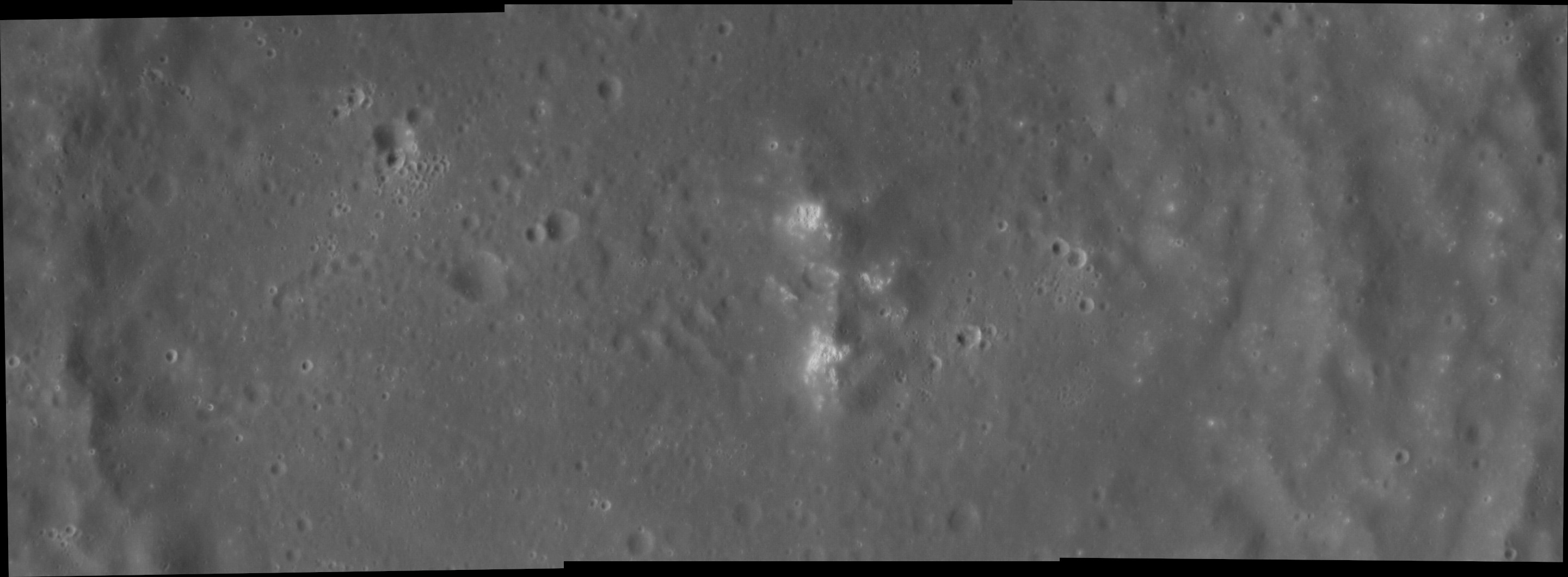
Part of Whitman crater, showing the central peak complex and possible hollows
