= Tydskrif vir Letterkunde =

- Discipline: African literature
- Language: Afrikaans
- Edited by: Hein Willemse

Publication details
- Former names: Die Afrikaanse boek, Jaarboek van die Afrikaanse Skrywerskring
- Publisher: University of Pretoria (South Africa)

Standard abbreviations
- ISO 4: Tydskr. Lett.

Indexing
- ISSN: 0041-476X (print); 2309-9070 (web)
- OCLC no.: 909890389

Links
- Journal homepage

Tydskrif vir Letterkunde (English: Journal for Literature) is a peer-reviewed academic journal covering African literature. The editor-in-chief is Hein Willemse (University of Pretoria).

== Special editions ==
Special editions dedicated to the literatures of certain African countries have appeared:

- Niger: 42(2), 2005 (Guest editor: Antoinette Tidjani-Alou)
- Burkina Faso: 44(1), 2007 (Guest editor: Salaka Sanou)
- Democratic Republic of the Congo: 46(1), 2009 (Guest editors: Luc Renders & Henriette Roos)
- Nigeria: 48(1), 2011 (Guest editor: Isidore Diala)
- Cameroon: 53(1), 2016 (Guest editor: Juliana Makuchi Nfah-Abbenyi)

A few editions are also dedicated to the oeuvres of writers:

- André Brink: 42(1), 2005
- Breyten Breytenbach: 46(2), 2009
- Adam Small: 49(1), 2012
- Thomas Mofolo: 53(2), 2016 (Guest editors: Antjie Krog & Chris Dunton)

== History ==
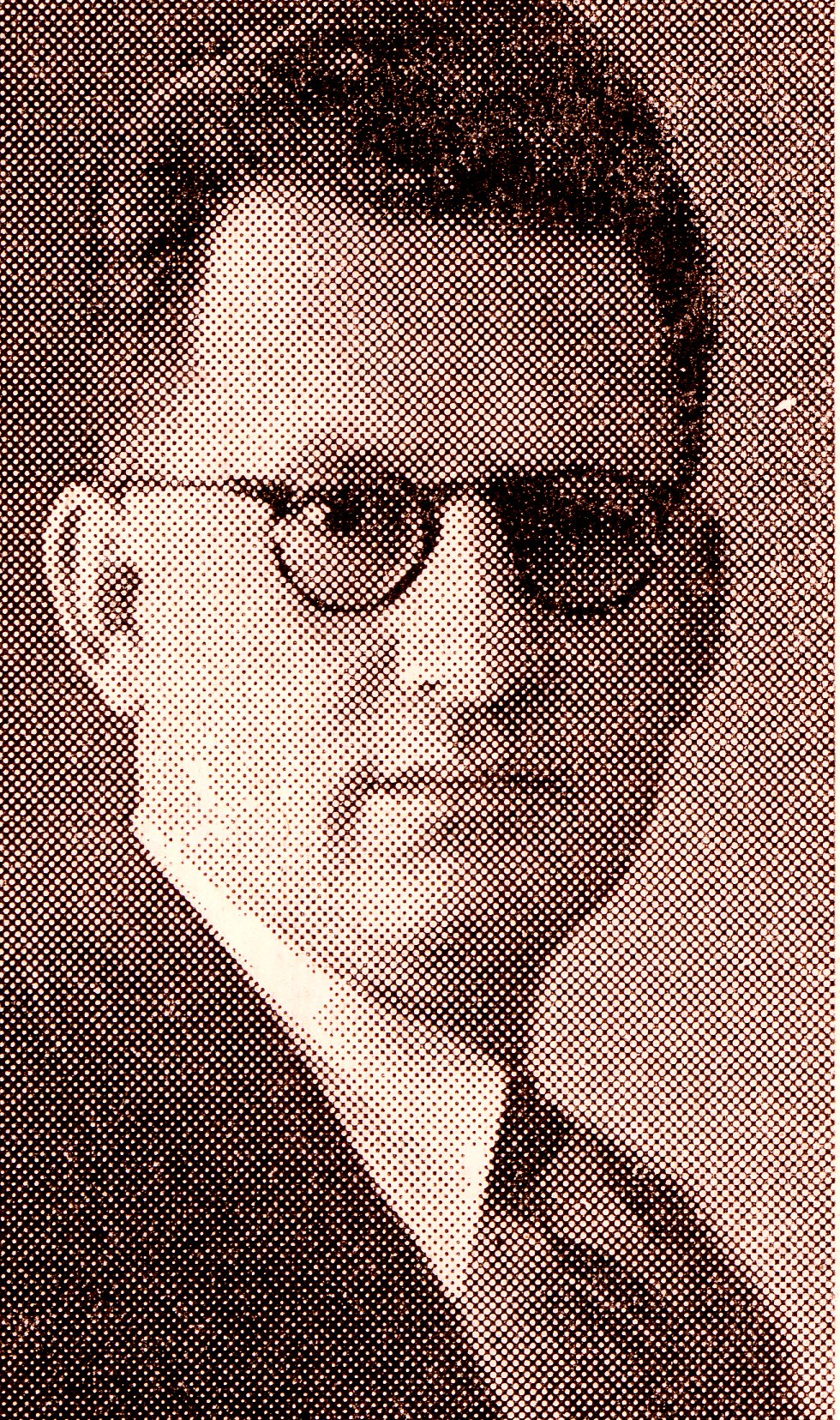
Abel J. Coetzee.

Originally, the journal was known as Die Afrikaanse boek. In 1936 it became the journal for the "Afrikaanse Skrywersvereniging". The Skrywerskring was founded in Johannesburg and its goal was to positively promote the Afrikaans literature and arts. The journal's title was soon changed to Jaarboek van die Afrikaanse Skrywersvereniging. It held this title until 1950. The first editions were compiled by C.M. van den Heever, Abel Coetzee and other prominent writers that were part of the Skrywerskring. The group did not allow any women to join the group. Elisabeth Eybers, a poet who was not allowed to join the group, once described it as: "Die Johannesburgse Vereniging vir Manlike Belangstellendes in Letterkunde" [The Johannesburg Association for Men interested in Literature].

Along with its establishment in 1934, the Skrywerskring was affiliated with the International PEN-club, A World Association of Writers. Today, this club still sees the protection of the author's intellectual property as very important. In order to establish a democratic society, the club recognised that it was also important for writers be able to freely express themselves so that a diverse body of voices can be heard.

When the National Party (NP) came to power in 1948 they strictly upheld the apartheid policy. The Skrywerskring, however, was careful to not be too opinionated about or critical toward any political events. They did not want to attract the attention of parliament or any prominent societal figures. The main focus of the Skrywerskring was to create a dialogue about literature, not a polemical dialogue about social or political events. During a congress in 1948 PEN members raised questions about discrimination inherent in apartheid policies. This created a tension between the Skrywerskring and PEN members and after some time the Skrywerskring withdrew its membership from the PEN-club.

Under the editorship of C.M. van den Heever, the journal was renamed to Tydskrif vir Letterkunde in 1951. It was also published quarterly. Van den Heever was the editor-in-chief for 21 years until his death in 1957. In the 1960s a once-off edition was published with the title 60 and the subtitle Tydskrif vir Letterkunde. Abel Coetzee was the editor-in-chief. The title 60 echoed the literary movement of the time and joined in with the voices of some of the most prominent writers of that time. The next edition that was published carried the title of Tydskrif vir Letterkunde and has continued to do so in the editions published since.

An edition that was published in 1963 voiced Coetzee's approval of the censure policy: "Waar dit nou in ons volksgemeenskap gebeur dat die uiterste vryheid van bepaalde kunstenaars in bepaalde rigtings in beslag gelê is moet ons as verantwoordelike volksgenote aanvaar dat die staatsbestuurlike funksionele groep dreigende gevare vir die gemeenskap sien groei, wat net op die manier bekamp kan word. Ons moet aanneem dat die optrede in goeie trou geskied en dat inperkinge óf net tydelik sal wees, óf net in die allernoodsaaklikste gevalle toegepas sal word" ["As citizens we should accept that the [censorship] group appointed, is assessing growing concerns for the community and acting upon it. This is in reference to the freedom of certain artists in certain directions that has been seized. We must accept that the actions taken are done in good faith and that any impingements will only be temporary or will only be applied in the most extreme circumstances."]

== Tydskrif vir Letterkunde on censure and finances ==
In its early history Tydskrif vir Letterkunde received a lot of criticism because it accepted money from the central government to finance the journal. The journal also received finances from the Afrikaanse Persfonds (a trust established from the personal funds of general J.B.M. Hertzog). In 1976 the funds were stopped because the trustees of the Persfonds felt the money would be better suited for other purposes, as they explained to the then editor-in-chief Elize Botha. Botha would seek other financial means and the Nasionale Pers Ltd would provide financial support until 2001. From 2001 all funds are raised by advertisements and authors' page fees.

The policy over publications that was enforced by the NP led to a careful reaction by the Skrywerskring. They did not want to upset the authorities who were providing financial support for the journal. Initially there were also members of the Skrywerskring associated with the censuring activities. Someone like N. P. van Wyk Louw opposed the censure policy from the start. He also published debates around the censure policy in the journal Standpunte.

Only in the 1970s did the Skrywerskring and Tydskrif react to the "Wysigingswet op Publikasiebeheer". This law meant that an appeal to the censuring of a work could be delivered to court. Today Tydskrif is strongly opposed against any measure that could impede freedom of speech. It also does not tolerate any form of publication management that could affect the being of the South African democracy.

== Tydskrif vir Letterkunde and Standpunte ==
Between the two journals Tydskrif vir Letterkunde and Standpunte there was a so-called north–south literary division. This was based on a geographic division between the North, known previously as the Transvaal, and the South, the current Western Cape. The first edition of Standpunte was published in 1945. It was important for the editorial members to create a platform where there was no external influence on the discussion of Afrikaans literature. The last edition of Standpunte appeared in 1986.

Elize Botha said over this division: "Vir baie jare het die persepsie bestaan dat Standpunte 'n ‘suidelike' literêre beskouing onderhou, en die Tydskrif 'n ‘noordelike' – wat dit presies beteken het, wil ek hier nie probeer uitlê nie; daar was in elk geval in die vroeë dekades van die tydskrifte se geskiedenis aanvoelbare spanning tussen die groepering rondom die Louws, en dié rondom C.M. van den Heever en sy vriend en kollega Abel Coetzee. Later het die spanning Noord-Suid een van die gemeenplase in literêre gesprekke geword." ["For many years there was the perception that Standpunte held a southern literary viewpoint and that Tydskrif held a northern literary viewpoint. It is difficult to explain exactly what this means, but there was a palpable tension in the early decades of the two journals' existence. That is, there was a tension between the Louws on the one side and C.M. van den Heever and his colleague and friend Abel Coetzee on the other side. Later this tension would become a platitude in literary conversations."]

== Editors-in-chief ==
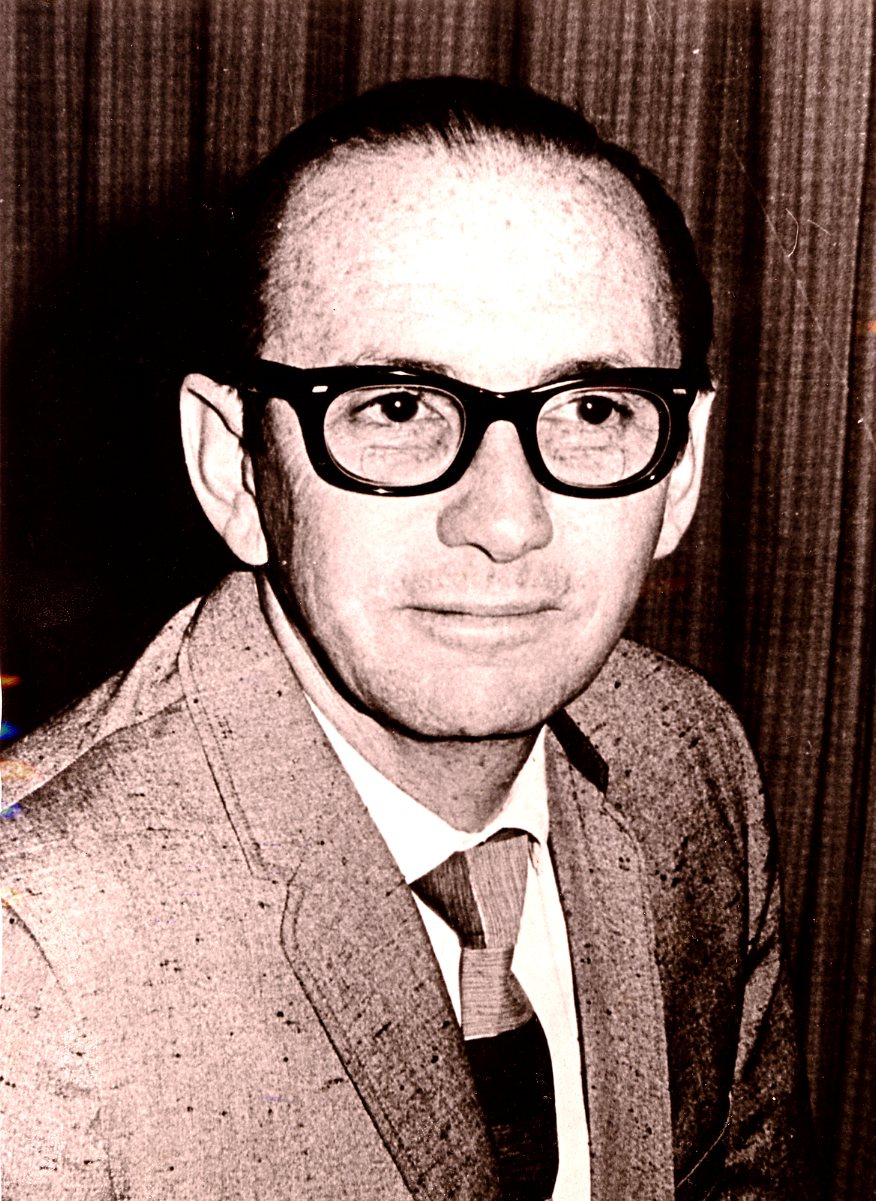
Coenie Rudolph.

From 1966 to 1973 Coenie Rudolph was the editor-in-chief of the journal. Rudolph was a writer who lived in Pretoria and was also a lecturer in education. Under his editorship many new, creative voices were published such as Abraham H. de Vries, Hennie Aucamp, Ingrid Jonker and Chris Barnard.

Elize Botha was appointed as Rudolph's successor in 1973. Botha was a South African academic and literary critic. She lectured at, among others, the University of South Africa and the University of Pretoria. Botha's appointment was quite a remarkable event as women were not previously allowed to be members of the Skrywerskring. The journal was very successful under Botha's editorship. Many new writers and poets debuted in the journal such as Lina Spies and P.J. Haasbroek. A new generation of "Tagtigers" also published in the journal during this time. In 1992 Henning Pieterse , a writer, poet and Hertzog prize winner, was appointed as the new editor-in-chief of Tydskrif vir Letterkunde. He was editor-in-chief for 10 years, until 2002. During this time, the Skrywerskring also disbanded.

Hein Willemse became editor-in-chief in 2003. Willemse is a South African academic, literary critic, activist and author. He brought a few changes to the journal. The journal now has a focus on a broad variety of African literature and editors and collaborators were appointed in Africa, North America and Europe. Because of the work with editors and collaborators of other countries, the journal's language policy was changed to not only include Afrikaans, but also Dutch, English and French. The format of the journal was adapted to mainly peer-reviewed scholarly articles and the journal is no longer published quarterly but bi-annually. Since 2016 the journal has only been published electronically. Only electronic submissions are accepted.
