= Cusanus (crater) =

Lunar crater

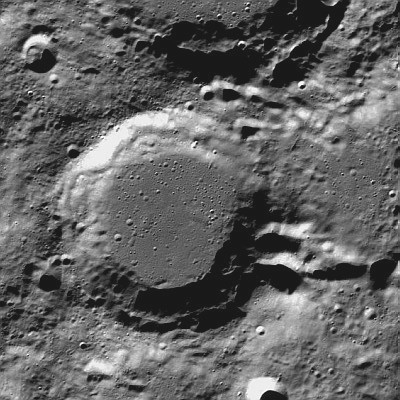
- LRO image
- Coordinates: 72.0°N 70.8°E
- Diameter: 60.87 km (37.82 mi)
- Depth: 3.39 km (2.11 mi)
- Colongitude: 293° at sunrise
- Eponym: Nikolaus K. Cusanus

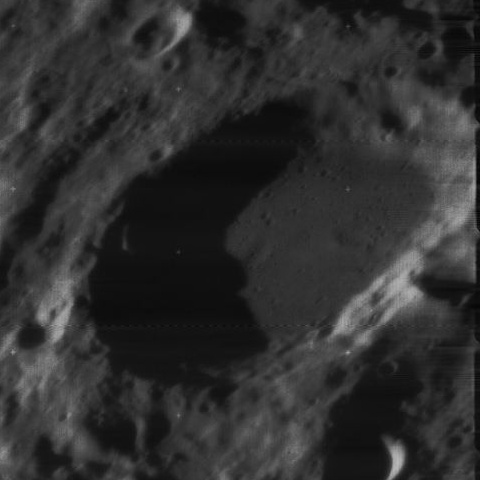
Oblique view from Lunar Orbiter 4

Cusanus is a lunar impact crater that is located near the northeastern limb of the Moon. In this location the crater appears foreshortened when observed from the Earth. The northern rim of Cusanus is nearly joined to the south-southeastern rim of the larger crater Petermann. To the west is Baillaud and to the southeast is Hayn.

The rim of this crater has been eroded and rounded due to a history of minor impacts. The terraces are still visible along the inner walls, although they are less sharply defined compared to younger crater formations. A pair of tiny craters form a notch along the eastern rim, and there is a slight inward bulge along the western inner wall. The interior has apparently been resurfaced with lava, leaving a flat and relatively featureless floor. But the lava was not of sufficient depth to significantly reduce the width of the inner walls.

This formation is named after German mathematician and philosopher Nikolaus K. Cusanus (1401-1464). His name was included in the lunar nomenclature of Italian astronomer Giovanni B. Riccioli in 1651, but was apparently assigned to a crater later identified as 'T. Mayer alpha'. Its modern designation was officially adopted by the International Astronomical Union in 1935.

== Satellite craters ==
By convention these features are identified on lunar maps by placing the letter on the side of the crater midpoint that is closest to Cusanus.

Cusanus	Latitude	Longitude	Diameter
A	70.6° N	64.0° E	16 km
B	70.1° N	64.5° E	21 km
C	70.4° N	60.8° E	25 km
E	72.0° N	72.3° E	10 km
F	70.7° N	73.3° E	10 km
G	69.9° N	76.9° E	10 km
H	69.4° N	59.4° E	8 km
