= Jabal al-ʿHayn =

Jabal al-ʿHayn (Arabic: جبل العهين, sometimes; Jabal Uhayn, Uhain or Uhain mount, literally the 'mount of censure') is a prominent outcrop of red sandstone in Saudi Arabia, known for its pre-historic petroglyphs, tribal markings (wusūm) and inscriptions in early Semitic languages as well as Arabic. The mountain is located in Medina Province, about 17.5 km north-east of the town of al-Hanākīyā (الحناكية) at 24°59'21"N 40°38'27"E.

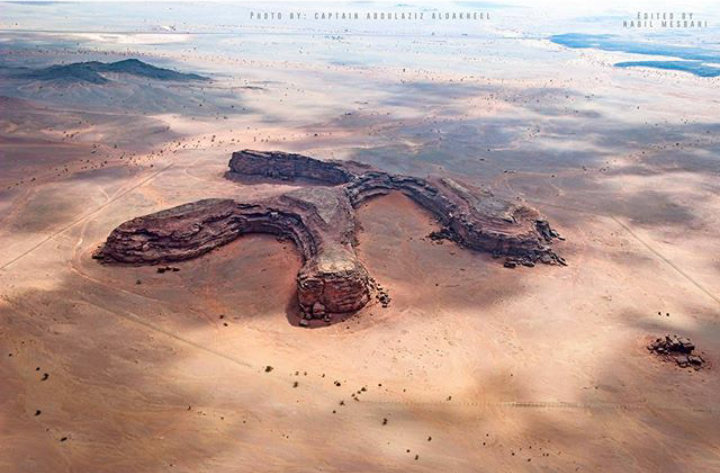
جبل العهين الحناكية

== Petroglyphs ==
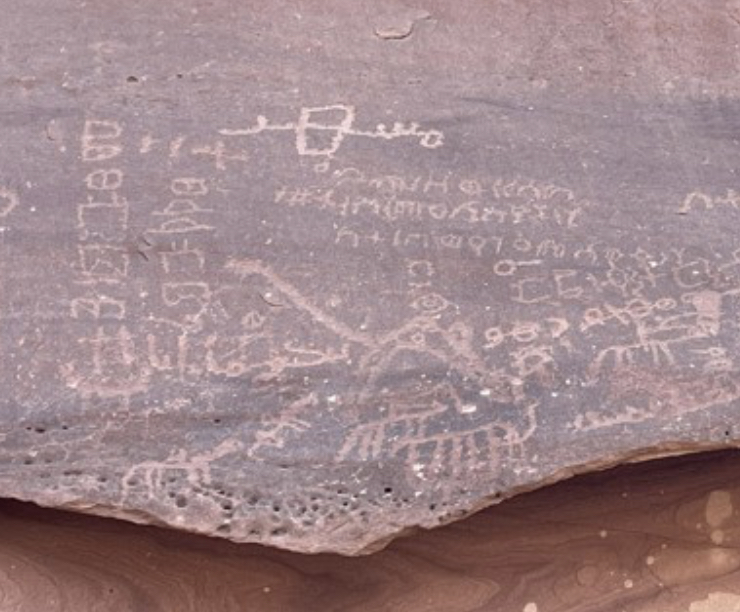
Jabal al-ʿHayn, Saudi Arabia. Tribal markings and a petroglyph showing a camel.

Ancient petroglyphs carved on the rock faces of Jabal al-ʿHayn depict horned bison, standing figures and an exceptional wild cat with a curling tail. Camels are shown in some petroglyphs that seem to be less ancient.

== Inscriptions ==
Among the many inscriptions at Jabal al-ʿHayn are a number in Arabic which date to the earliest years of the Islamic calendar. One inscription quotes Quran, Surah 18 Al-Kahf verse 21. The inscription was studied by Fred Donner and published in 1984. Following a frequently found formula, the inscription implores God to grant forgiveness and then bears witness to the hour of final judgement. In a second record of singular historical importance, an individual named Rāfiʿ bin 'Alī declares "I believe that there is no God except Him in whom the children of Israel believed, (believing as) a Muslim Hanif; nor am I among the polytheists." This gives a direct quote of Quran, Surah 10 Yunus verse 90.

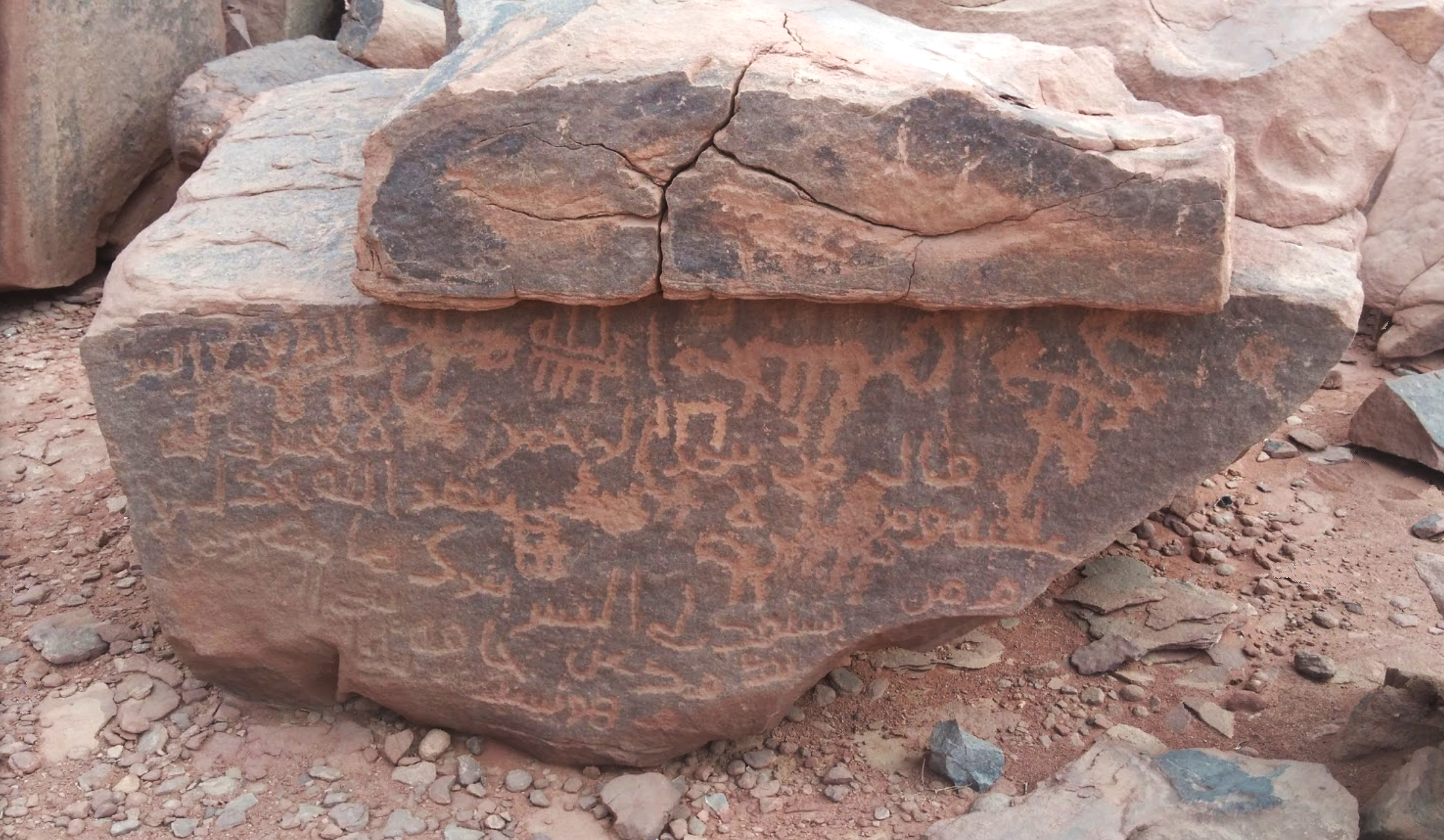
Jabal al-ʿHayn, Saudi Arabia. Rock inscribed with the name of God and a religious maxim.

Also published by Donner is an inscription on a boulder invoking the name of God and giving an exceptional religious maxim. This and the other inscriptions from the site are listed in Thesaurus d'épigraphie islamique, an online research resource supported by the Max van Berchem Foundation, founded in 1973 in honour of the celebrated epigraphist Max van Berchem (1863–1921).
