= Uwe Hain =

German former professional footballer (born 1955)

Personal information
- Date of birth: 18 October 1955 (age 71)
- Place of birth: Schladen, West Germany
- Height: 1.83 m (6 ft 0 in)
- Position: Goalkeeper

Team information
- Current team: SV Schladen (coach)

Youth career
- –1972: SV Schladen
- 1972–1974: Eintracht Braunschweig

Senior career*
Years	Team	Apps	(Gls)
1974–1982	Eintracht Braunschweig	39	(0)
1982–1987	Hamburger SV	7	(0)
1987–1991	Eintracht Braunschweig	156	(0)
1992	FC St. Pauli		
1992–1993	VfL Wolfsburg	3	(0)
1993–	Wolfenbütteler SV		
Total		205	(0)

Managerial career
- 1997–2009: Eintracht Braunschweig II
- 1998–2009: Eintracht Braunschweig (goalkeeping coach)
- 1999: Eintracht Braunschweig (care taker)
- 2001: Eintracht Braunschweig (care taker)
- 2011: SV Schladen
- * Club domestic league appearances and goals

Uwe Hain (born 18 October 1955) is a German former professional footballer who played as a goalkeeper. His brother, Mathias Hain, is also a professional footballer, playing in the same position.

== Honours ==
- Bundesliga: 1982–83
- European Cup: 1982–83
- DFB-Pokal: 1986–87
