= Sobkou Planitia =

Planitia on Mercury

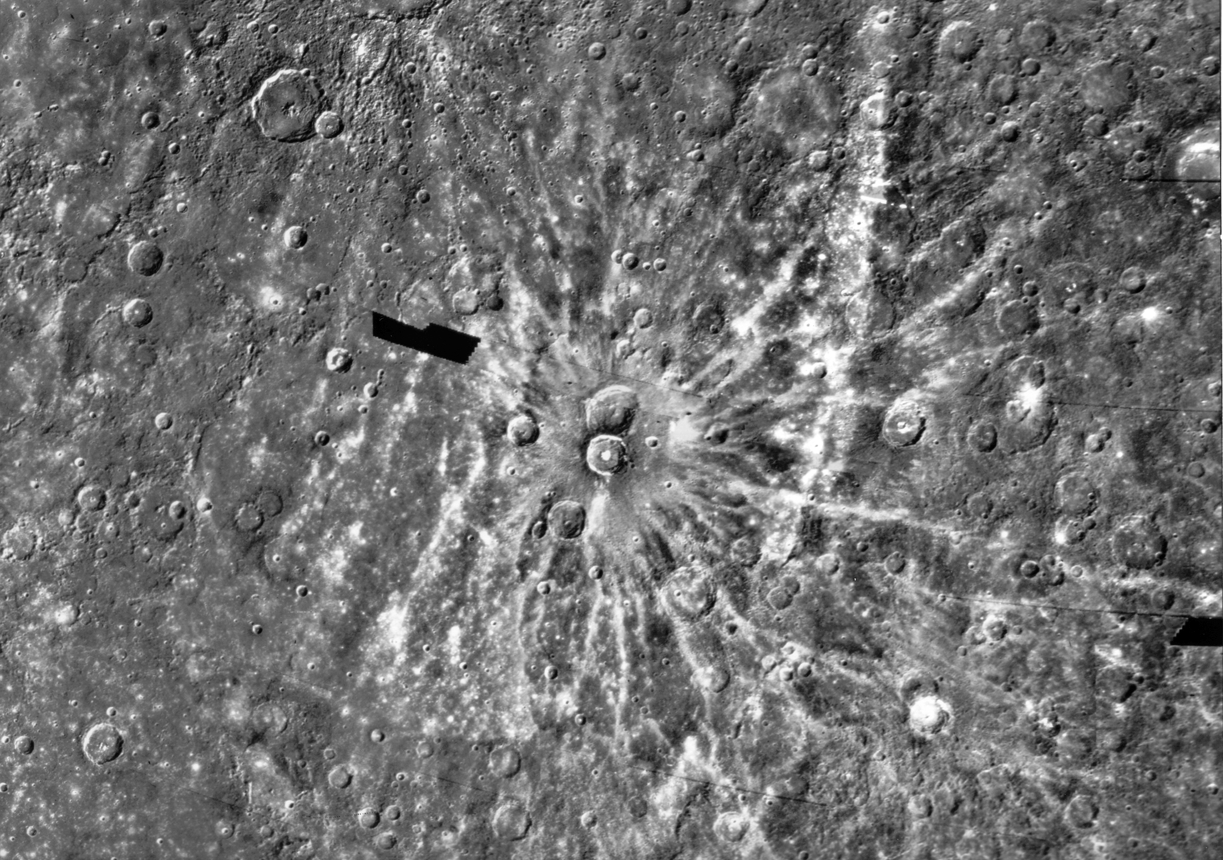
- Mariner 10 image of Sobkou Planitia showing the crater pair Degas and Brontë
- Location: Shakespeare quadrangle, Mercury
- Coordinates: 39°N 128°W
- Eponym: Egyptian messenger god Sobek

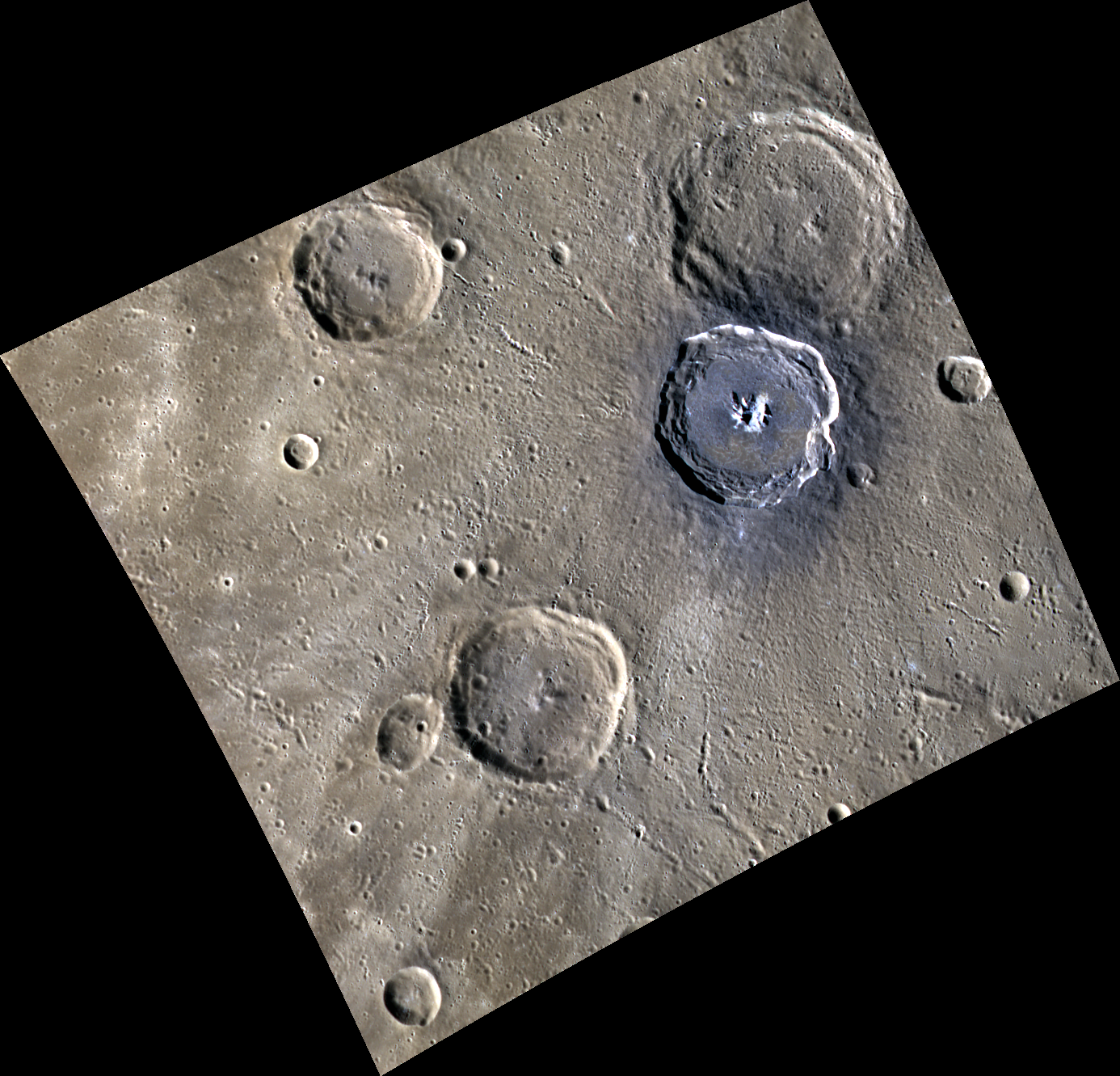
Color image of central Sobkou Planitia with the craters Brontë and Degas at right

Sobkou Planitia is a large basin on the planet Mercury. It is named after the ancient Egyptian messenger deity Sobkou (whose name is more usually transliterated Sobek). He was associated by the Egyptians with the planet Mercury.

== History ==
Sobkou Planitia was discovered after Sobkou, the basin, was recognized as a Pre-Tolstojan basin on images from Mariner 10.

=== Geology ===
The most prominent features within the plain itself are a pair of craters, similar in size to one another, known as Brontë and Degas. Brontë is the older of the two craters, and the impact that formed Degas has overlapped the edges of that older crater and spread a spray of rays across the southern regions of Sobkou Planitia and beyond.

According to Peter Grego's book Venus and Mercury and how to observe them Sobkou Planitia is free of scarps, ridges, fractures and valleys. Its southeastern edge is bordered by the scarp Heemskerck Rupes which is about 300 km long which along part of the line of a very broad, bright swathe which is 1,000 km long and terminating just to the east of Chŏng Chʼŏl crater.

A gravitational high, also known as a mascon, is roughly centered on Sobkou Planitia. Most large impact basins on the moon, such as Mare Imbrium and Mare Crisium, are the site of mascons.
