= Heine Brothers' =

American chain of coffee shops

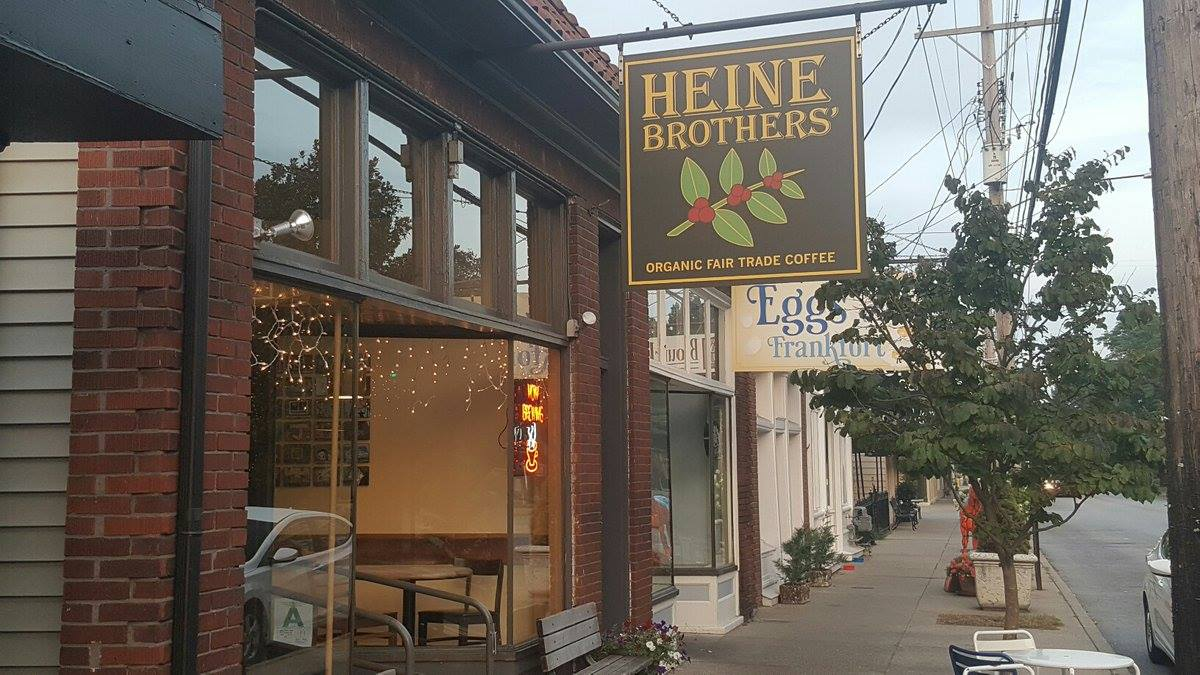
- Heine Brothers' location in Louisville's Crescent Hill neighborhood
- Industry: Coffee shop
- Founded: 1994; 32 years ago
- Headquarters: Louisville, Kentucky
- Products: Coffee, tea
- Website: heinebroscoffee.com

Heine Brothers' is a coffee roaster and coffee shop chain founded in 1994 by Gary Heine and Mike Mays in Louisville, Kentucky. Mays is president of the company.

The company has 200-300 employees.

== History ==
The first Heine Brothers' shop was opened in the Highlands neighborhood in Louisville in 1994.

The company became "100% Fair-Trade & Organic" in 2002.

In 2011, co-founder Mays bought out Heine's interests in the company and merged it with Vint, a local coffee shop chain. Today, the company operates 16 Heine Brothers' coffee shops within Kentucky and Southern Indiana.

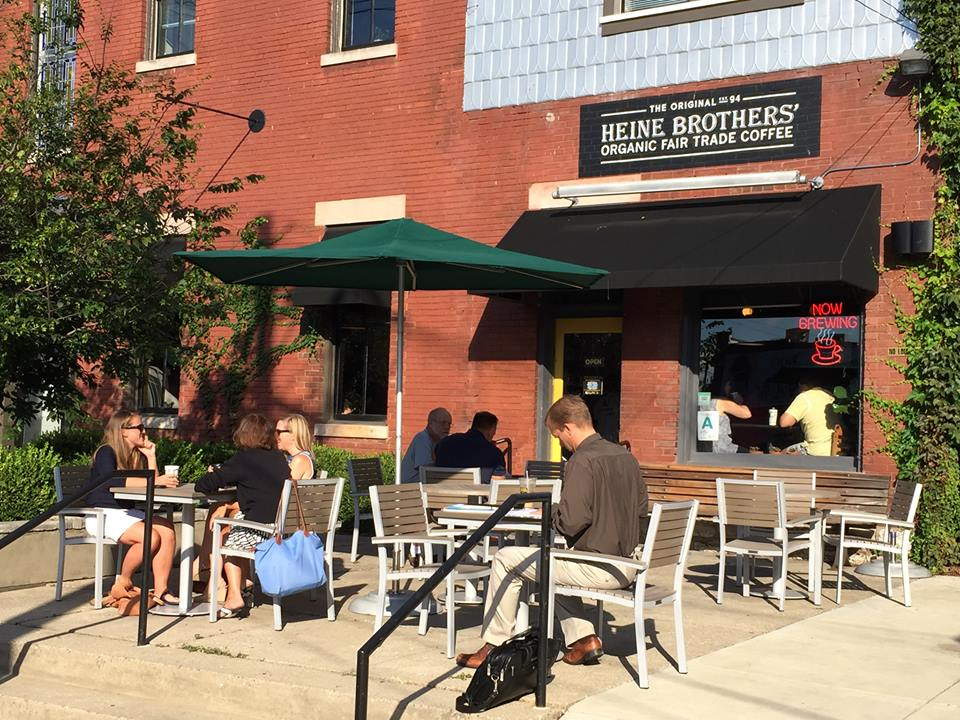
Heine Brothers' location in The Highlands

In 1999, Heine Brothers' became a founding member of Cooperative Coffees, Inc., an importer of fairly traded and organically grown green coffee operating in the United States and Canada.

In early 2015, in a partnership with Forecastle Foundation and Whole Foods Market, Heine Brothers' created "Kentucky Dream", a fair trade coffee blend benefiting conservation efforts.

In November 2016, the company relocated its roasting facilities and headquarters to Louisville's Portland neighborhood.

In August 2017, Heine Brothers' partnered with WDRB, a local, Fox-affiliated television station, to distribute eclipse glasses for the solar eclipse of August 21, 2017. Funds raised from the promotion, totaling $50,702, were donated to the Louisville Science Center.

In 2021, the company expanded with one more shop in Valley Station.

On May 10, 2022, several Heine Brothers workers announced their intention to form a union. On March 17, 2023, the workers' union ratified their first collective bargaining agreement with the company.

On March 25, 2026, a 19 year old Kentucky Christian college student and former employee of Heine Brothers, Paige Rodgers, sued the company for wrongful termination, discrimination, and creating a hostile work environment. Roger's coworker asked about her views on marriage and sexuality, then filed a complaint after Roger's answered truthfully. Heine Brothers terminated Rodger's employment within two weeks via text stating ""It was reported and confirmed that you engaged in conversations in the workplace where you expressed religious beliefs in a manner that was unwelcome and offensive to others," the text read. "These conversations created discomfort among team members and contributed to a work environment inconsistent with our company values and code of conduct."

== Production ==
Currently, the company's coffee offerings are grown and exported by farmer-owned cooperatives in Central America (Dominican Republic, Mexico, Guatemala, Nicaragua), South America (Colombia, Peru, Bolivia), Africa (Ethiopia), Indonesia (Sumatra, East Timor).
