= Burns (crater) =

Crater on Mercury

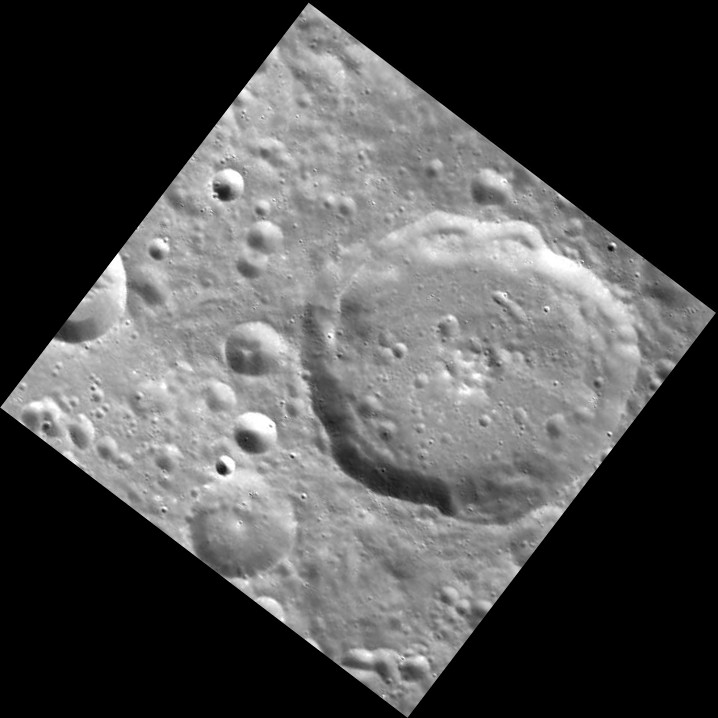
- MESSENGER WAC image of Burns
- Feature type: Impact crater
- Location: Shakespeare quadrangle, Mercury
- Coordinates: 54.10°N 117.37°W
- Diameter: 43 km (27 mi)
- Eponym: Robert Burns

Burns is a crater on Mercury. Its name was adopted by the International Astronomical Union (IAU) in 1985. Burns is named for the Scottish poet Robert Burns, who lived from 1759 to 1796. The crater was first imaged by Mariner 10 in 1974.

To the southeast of Burns is the crater To Ngoc Van, which shows evidence of volcanic activity.
