= Hein Willemse =

South African writer

- Born: Heinrich Stephen Samuel Willemse; 18 September 1957; Ladismith, Cape Province, South Africa
- Occupations: Academic; Literary Critic; Activist; Author
- Spouse: Carol-Ann P. Mohamed

Heinrich Stephen Samuel Willemse (born 18 September 1957, Ladismith, Cape Province) is a South African academic, literary critic, activist and author. He currently serves as professor in the Department of Afrikaans at the University of Pretoria, South Africa. He was the former editor-in-chief of the African literary journal Tydskrif vir Letterkunde (Journal for Literature).

As a young academic, Willemse played an active role in the opposition of apartheid, and along with other Afrikaans authors - including André Brink, Breyten Breytenbach and Etienne van Heerden - attended the historical Victoria Falls Writers' Conference in 1989, where various Afrikaans intellectuals met with banned South African authors and members of the African National Congress.

== Biography ==
Willemse grew up in the Cape Province in South Africa where he completed his school education at Esselen Park High in 1975. He thereafter completed his bachelor's degree in law at the University of the Western Cape (UWC) in Bellville, South Africa, in 1978. While completing his honours degree in Afrikaans language and literature at the same institution in 1979, Willemse worked as a legal councillor in UWC's legal aid clinic.

== Career ==
Willemse went on to complete both his master's degree (in 1984) and DLitt (in 1996) in the Department of Afrikaans and Dutch at the University of the Western Cape. Since he received his master's degree, Willemse has lectured at various South African and international universities, including El Colegio de México (Mexico), the University of Namibia (Namibia) and the University of Stellenbosch (South Africa). During 2004 and 2005 he also served as Fulbright professor and scholar at Grinnell College (Iowa, US). In 1985 he was honorary fellow in writing at the University of Iowa in the United States. In 2002 he completed his MBL degree at the University of South Africa (UNISA).

From 2000 to 2009 Willemse served as head of the Department of Afrikaans at the University of Pretoria, South Africa. Although he stepped down from this position recently (succeeded by Willie Burger, former head of the Department of Afrikaans at the University of Johannesburg), Willemse is still professor of Afrikaans literature and media studies, teaching both undergraduate and graduate courses.

Willemse is a former president of ISOLA (The International Society for the Oral Literatures of Africa). He was editor-in-chief of the journal Tydskrif vir Letterkunde (Journal for Literature): a journal for African literature from 2003 until 2019. Besides his academic activities, he also currently serves on the board of directors of the South Africa-based multinational media company Naspers.

== Publications ==
Willemse has published widely in academic journals and South African national newspapers. He is a regular contributor to LitNet, an Afrikaans literary e-zine, and he has also authored and edited several works of literature.

=== Books ===
==== As editor ====
- Die Trojaanse perd (1986, Taurus)
- Swart Afrikaanse skrywers (1986, University of the Western Cape Press)
- iQabane Labantu (Co-editor, 1989, Taurus)
- Die reis na Paternoster (Co-editor, 1997, University of the Western Cape Press)
- Die stukke wat ons sny (1999, Kwela)
- More than brothers: Peter Clarke and James Matthews at 70 (2000, Kwela)

==== As author ====
- Angsland (volume of poetry, 1981, Blac Publishers)
- Aan die ander kant (on black Afrikaans authors in the Afrikaans literature, 2007, Protea Boekhuis)
