= Bruegel (crater) =

Crater on Mercury

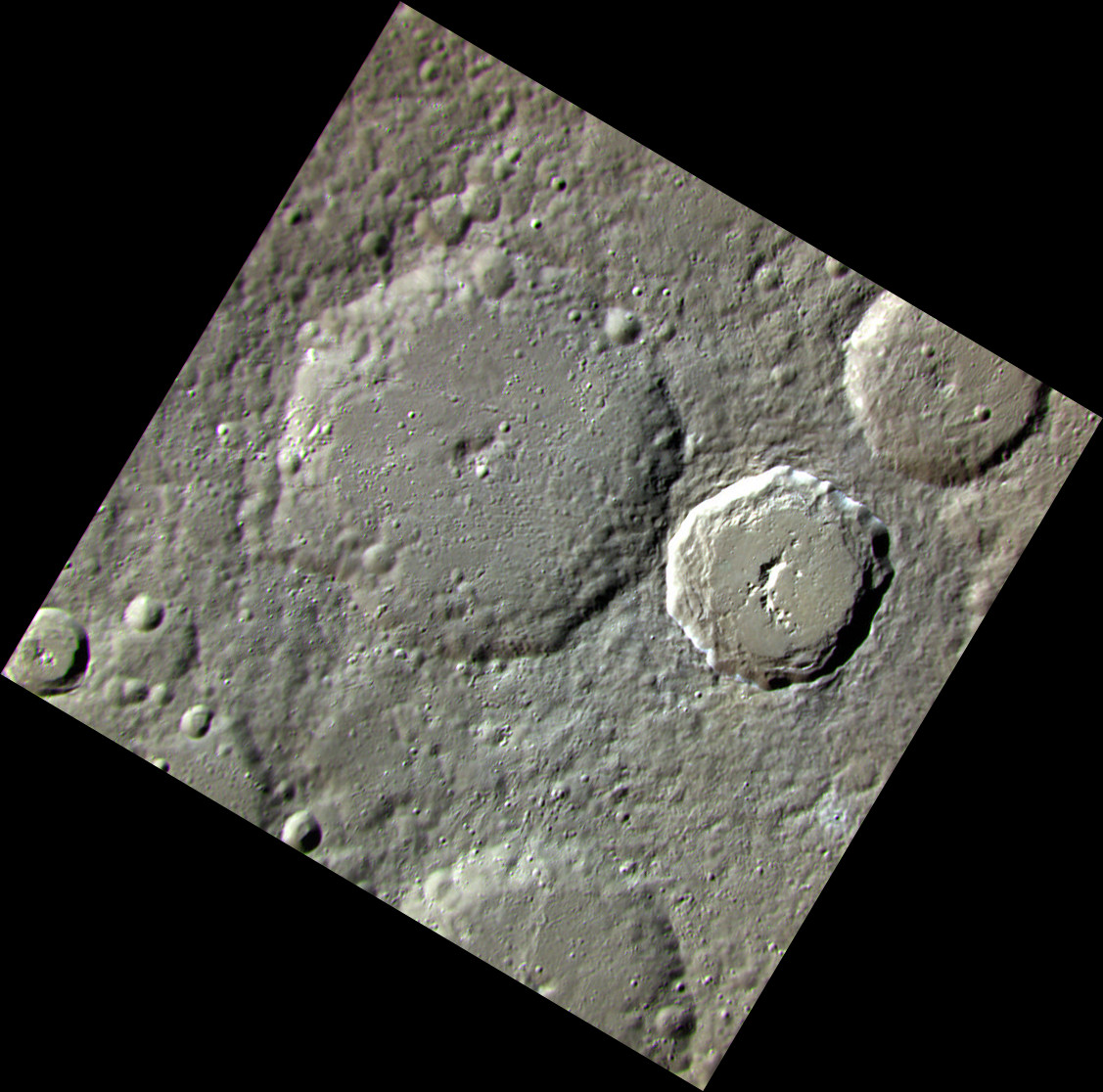
- Bruegel crater and unnamed craters to the east, by MESSENGER in approximate color
- Feature type: Impact crater
- Location: Shakespeare quadrangle, Mercury
- Coordinates: 49.73°N 109.46°W
- Diameter: 72 km (45 mi)
- Eponym: Pieter Bruegel the Elder

Bruegel is a crater on Mercury. It has a diameter of 72 kilometers. Its name was adopted by the International Astronomical Union in 1985. Bruegel is named for the Flemish painter Pieter Bruegel the Elder, who lived from 1525 to 1569. The crater was first imaged by Mariner 10 in 1974.

Bruegel is located southeast of To Ngoc Van crater, which shows evidence of volcanic activity.
