= Friedrich Hayn =

German astronomer

Friedrich Karl Traugott Hayn (14 May 1863 – 9 September 1928) was a German astronomer.

== Biography ==
Hayn was born in Auerbach, Saxony, in 1863, the son of a pastor. He attended high school in Dresden. From 1883 to 1888, he studied astronomy at Leipzig University and the University of Göttingen. In 1888, he received his doctorate from Göttingen after determining the orbit of Comet Swift–Tuttle, which had been discovered in 1862. In 1891, he became an assistant at Leipzig Observatory. In 1920, he turned down an offer from the Koenigsberg Observatory, and became an associate professor at Leipzig. Throughout his career, he surveyed, among other things, the Pleiades cluster and certain rotational elements of the moon. In 1897, he published Astronomische Ortsbestimmungen im Deutschen Schutzgebiete der Südsee, an account of his lunar studies. He also wrote an article in Klein's encyclopedia, and developed a type of electric clock.

== Legacy ==
The lunar crater Hayn is named after him.
