= Mathias Hain =

German footballer

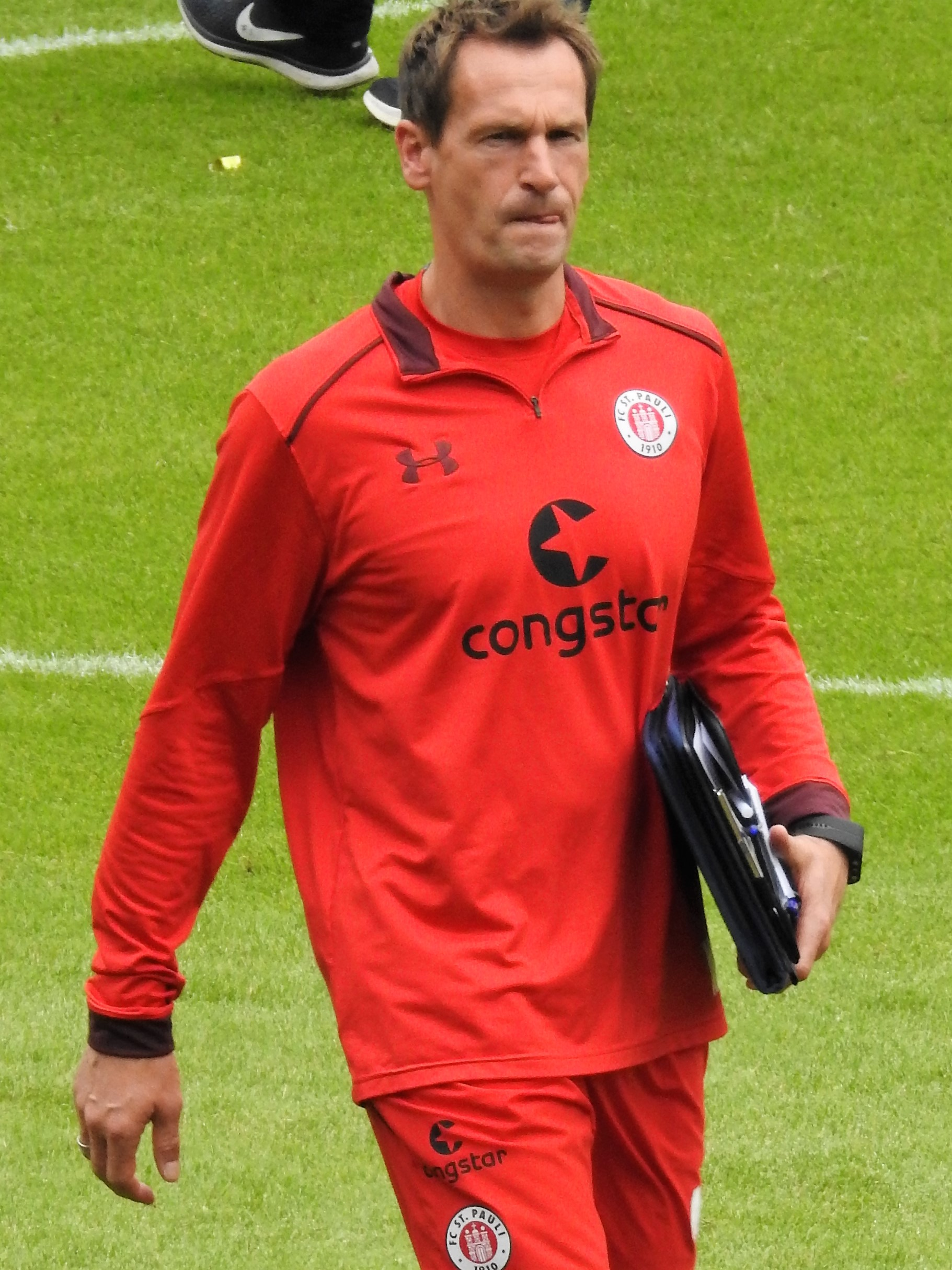
- Hain with St. Pauli in 2017

Personal information
- Full name: Mathias Hain
- Date of birth: 31 December 1972 (age 53)
- Place of birth: Goslar, West Germany
- Height: 1.88 m (6 ft 2 in)
- Position: Goalkeeper

Youth career
- 1978–1988: SV Schladen
- 1988–1989: FG Vienenburg

Senior career*
| Years | Team | Apps | (Gls) |
| 1989–1999 | Eintracht Braunschweig | 179 | (1) |
| 1999–2000 | Greuther Fürth | 22 | (0) |
| 2000–2008 | Arminia Bielefeld | 243 | (0) |
| 2008–2011 | FC St. Pauli | 69 | (0) |
| Total | | 513 | (1) |

Managerial career
- 2011–2015: FC St. Pauli (goalkeeper coach)
- * Club domestic league appearances and goals

Mathias Hain (born 31 December 1972) is a German former professional footballer who played as a goalkeeper. He is the brother of Uwe Hain, himself a former goalkeeper. Hain was known for his great shot stopping ability and, during his time at Arminia Bielefeld, captained the side until he left in 2008. He currently works as a goalkeeping coach for his final club as a player - Hamburg based FC St. Pauli.

== Career statistics ==
Appearances and goals by club, season and competition
| Club | Season | League | | | Cup | | Total | |
| Club | Season | Division | Apps | Goals | Apps | Goals | Apps | Goals |
|---|---|---|---|---|---|---|---|---|
| Eintracht Braunschweig | 1991–92 | 2. Bundesliga | 13 | 0 | 0 | 0 | 13 | 0 |
| Eintracht Braunschweig | 1992–93 | 2. Bundesliga | 1 | 0 | 1 | 0 | 2 | 0 |
| Eintracht Braunschweig | 1993–94 | Oberliga Nord | 1 | 0 | 0 | 0 | 1 | 0 |
| Eintracht Braunschweig | 1994–95 | Regionalliga Nord | 33 | 0 | — | | 33 | 0 |
| Eintracht Braunschweig | 1995–96 | Regionalliga Nord | 31 | 1 | — | | 31 | 1 |
| Eintracht Braunschweig | 1996–97 | Regionalliga Nord | 34 | 0 | — | | 34 | 0 |
| Eintracht Braunschweig | 1997–98 | Regionalliga Nord | 33 | 0 | — | | 33 | 0 |
| Eintracht Braunschweig | 1998–99 | Regionalliga Nord | 33 | 0 | — | | 33 | 0 |
| Eintracht Braunschweig | Total | | 179 | 1 | 1 | 0 | 180 | 1 |
| Greuther Fürth | 1999–2000 | 2. Bundesliga | 12 | 0 | 1 | 0 | 13 | 0 |
| Greuther Fürth | 2000–01 | 2. Bundesliga | 10 | 0 | 1 | 0 | 11 | 0 |
| Greuther Fürth | Total | | 22 | 0 | 2 | 0 | 24 | 0 |
| Arminia Bielefeld | 2000–01 | 2. Bundesliga | 24 | 0 | 1 | 0 | 25 | 0 |
| Arminia Bielefeld | 2001–02 | 2. Bundesliga | 33 | 0 | 2 | 0 | 35 | 0 |
| Arminia Bielefeld | 2002–03 | Bundesliga | 34 | 0 | 1 | 0 | 35 | 0 |
| Arminia Bielefeld | 2003–04 | 2. Bundesliga | 34 | 0 | 1 | 0 | 34 | 0 |
| Arminia Bielefeld | 2004–05 | Bundesliga | 34 | 0 | 5 | 0 | 39 | 0 |
| Arminia Bielefeld | 2005–06 | Bundesliga | 33 | 0 | 4 | 0 | 37 | 0 |
| Arminia Bielefeld | 2006–07 | Bundesliga | 31 | 0 | 1 | 0 | 31 | 0 |
| Arminia Bielefeld | 2007–08 | Bundesliga | 20 | 0 | 3 | 0 | 23 | 0 |
| Arminia Bielefeld | Total | | 243 | 0 | 18 | 0 | 261 | 0 |
| FC St. Pauli | 2008–09 | 2. Bundesliga | 32 | 0 | 1 | 0 | 33 | 0 |
| FC St. Pauli | 2009–10 | 2. Bundesliga | 33 | 0 | 2 | 0 | 35 | 0 |
| FC St. Pauli | 2010–11 | Bundesliga | 4 | 0 | 0 | 0 | 4 | 0 |
| FC St. Pauli | Total | | 69 | 0 | 3 | 0 | 72 | 0 |
| Career total | | | 513 | 1 | 24 | 0 | 537 | 1 |
