= Hain, Ghana =

Community in Upper West Region, Ghana

Hain
- Location in Ghana
- Coordinates: 10°41′24″N 2°26′36″W
- Country: Ghana
- Region: Upper West Region
- District: Jirapa District

Hain is a community in the Jirapa District in the Upper West Region of Ghana. The residents of Hain celebrate the Tinmaale Festival.

== Institutions ==
- Baalayele Company
- Hain Police Station
- Ghana National Fire Station, Hain
- Hain District Assembly Basic Schools
- Hain Polyclinic
