= David W. Hein =

American toxicology professor and scientist

David Hein
- Born: Faith, South Dakota
- Education: University of Wisconsin-Eau Claire; University of Michigan
- Occupations: Professor; Scientist;
- Known for: Education; Cancer research
- Children: 3 sons

David W. Hein is an American professor and scientist. He is a Distinguished University Scholar at the University of Louisville, where he serves as the Peter K. Knoefel Endowed Chair of Pharmacology and Professor & Chair of the Department of Pharmacology & Toxicology.

== Life and education ==
Hein was born in Faith, South Dakota, and attended Wisconsin Lutheran High School in Milwaukee, Wisconsin. He completed his undergraduate work at the University of Wisconsin-Eau Claire, where he received a B.S. in chemistry. He completed his PhD in pharmacology at the University of Michigan.

== Career ==
Hein began his career at the Morehouse School of Medicine, where he chaired the Department of Pharmacology. In 1989, he was appointed as Professor and Chair of the Department of Pharmacology and Toxicology at the University of North Dakota, where he became a Chester Fritz Distinguished Professor. In 1997, Hein moved to the University of Louisville, where he serves as the Peter K. Knoefel Professor and Chair of the Department of Pharmacology & Toxicology and Distinguished University Scholar. Additionally, he has presented the Astor Visiting Lectureship at the University of Oxford and served as a visiting professor at the University of Paris. He was elected as a fellow of the Royal Society of Chemistry and of the Academy of ASPET Pharmacology Educators of the American Society for Pharmacology and Experimental Therapeutics.

== Research ==
Hein's research program incorporates precision environmental health and precision medicine. This includes research in personalized medicine and individual susceptibility to environmental diseases. Additionally, his research in pharmacogenomics sheds light on the genetic causes of prescription drug failure. Widely published in scientific journals, Hein has authored over 1000 scholarly and creative works. He has delivered over 150 presentations across the US and the world. He was awarded with multiple outstanding teaching awards, from both the University of North Dakota and Morehouse School of Medicine
