= Degas (crater) =

Crater on Mercury

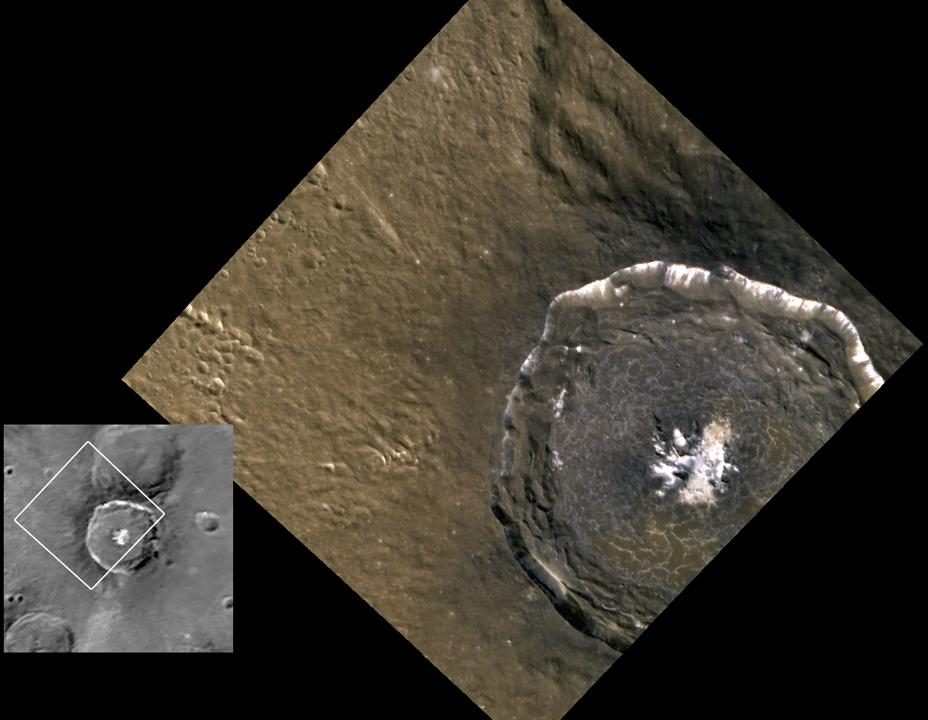
- Degas crater, MESSENGER spacecraft image, 2011. Inset is Mariner 10 image from 1974.
- Feature type: Central-peak impact crater
- Location: Shakespeare quadrangle, Mercury
- Coordinates: 37.08°N 127.34°W
- Diameter: 54 km (34 mi)
- Discoverer: Mariner 10
- Eponym: Edgar Degas

Degas is a young crater on Mercury. It was named after the French impressionist painter Edgar Degas in 1979. The crater was first imaged by Mariner 10 in 1974.

The prominent rays of the crater consist of light colored material blasted out during the crater's formation. Craters older than Degas are covered by the ray material, while younger craters are seen superimposed on the rays. Degas forms a crater pair with Brontë to the north. Both lie near the center of Sobkou Planitia.

The crater's floor contains cracks that formed as the pool of impact melt cooled and shrank. The high-reflectance material on the walls and in the central portion of the crater probably has a composition distinct from that of the crater floor and surroundings. The illumination conditions and down-slope movement of eroded material exposing fresh rock also contribute to the bright appearance. The floor of Degas exposed low-reflectance material (LRM).

Degas is one of the largest craters of the Kuiperian system on Mercury. The largest is Bartók crater.

== Views ==
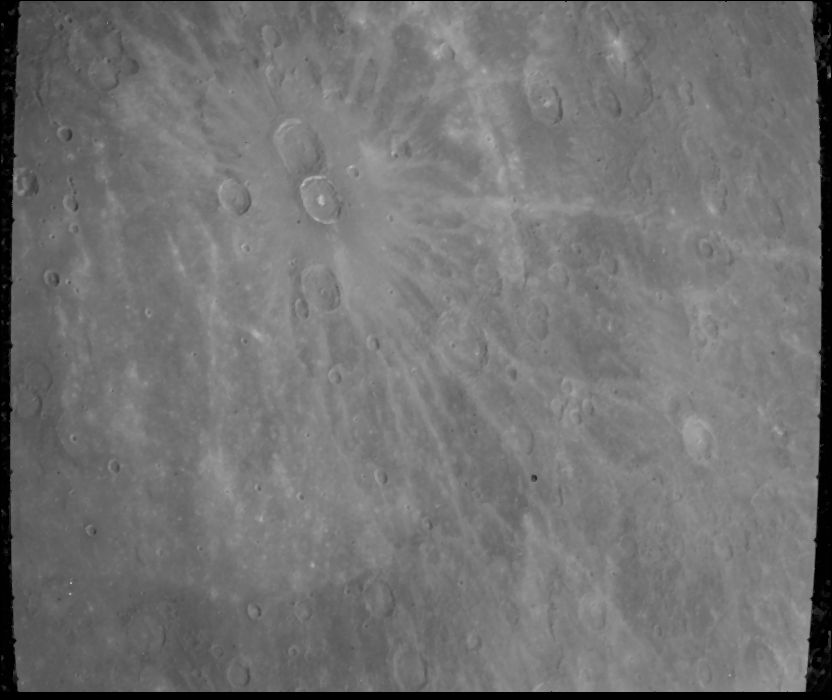
Mariner 10 image

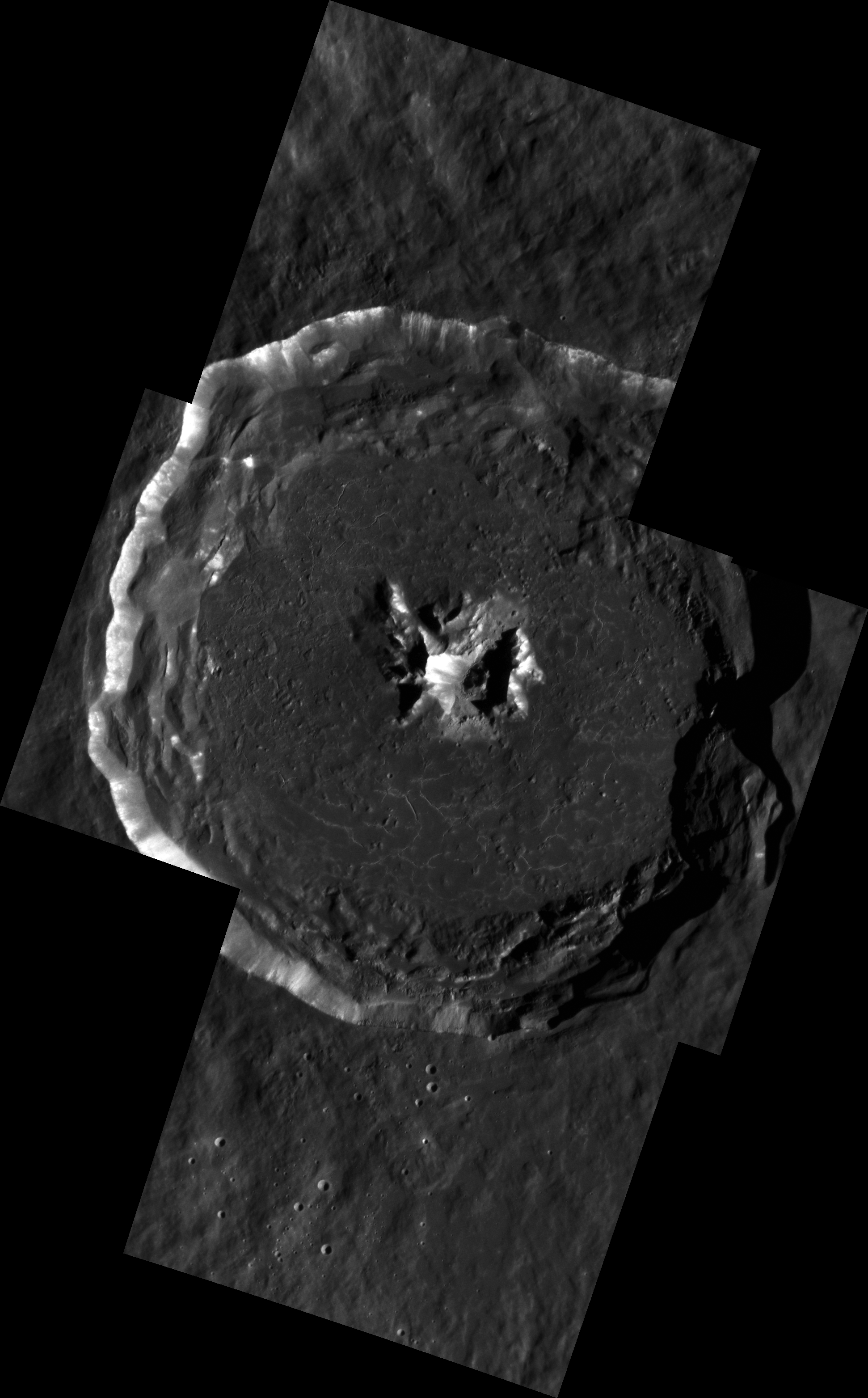
MESSENGER mosaic

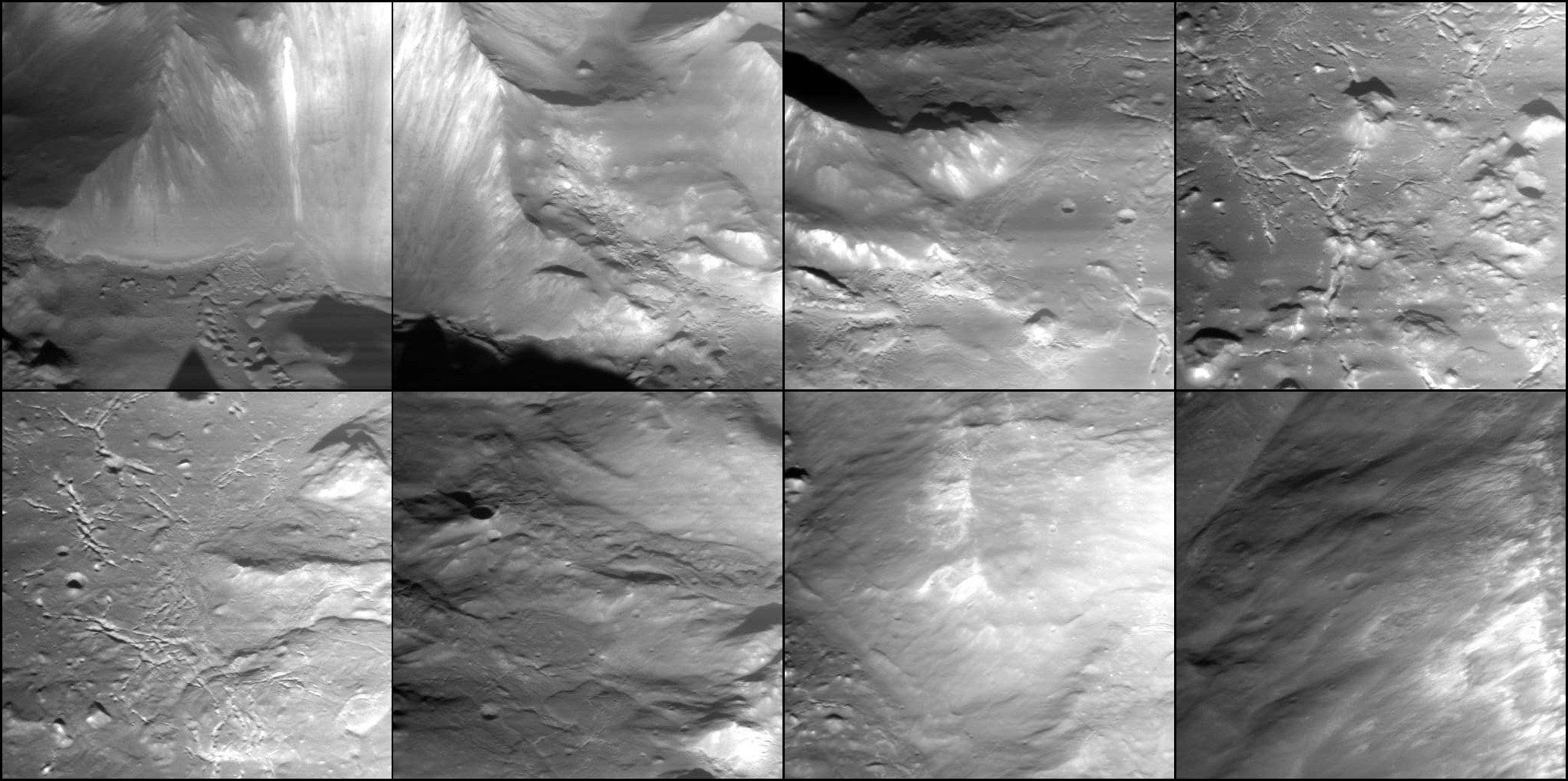
Sequence of adjacent but non-overlapping images acquired by MESSENGER NAC of the interior of Degas. All images are oblique and looking northwest. The upper left three images show the central peak. The upper right and lower left images show the fractured crater floor. The two central bottom images show terraces and flow structures on the northern slope of the crater wall. The lower right image shows the crater rim. Distance across foreground in each image is approximately 2.5 km.
