= To Ngoc Van (crater) =

Crater on Mercury

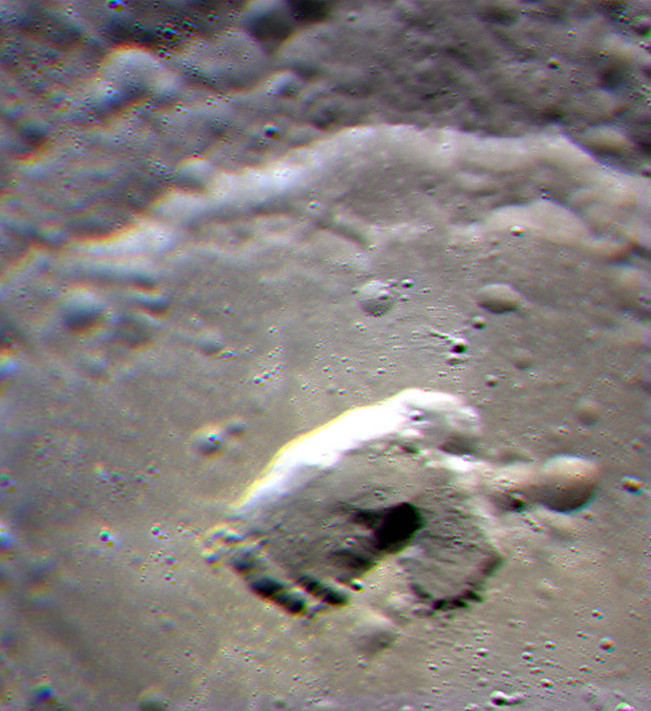
- Central pit feature of To Ngoc Van crater by MESSENGER in approximate color
- Feature type: Impact crater
- Location: Shakespeare quadrangle, Mercury
- Coordinates: 52.49°N 111.7°W
- Diameter: 71 km (44 mi)
- Eponym: Tô Ngọc Vân

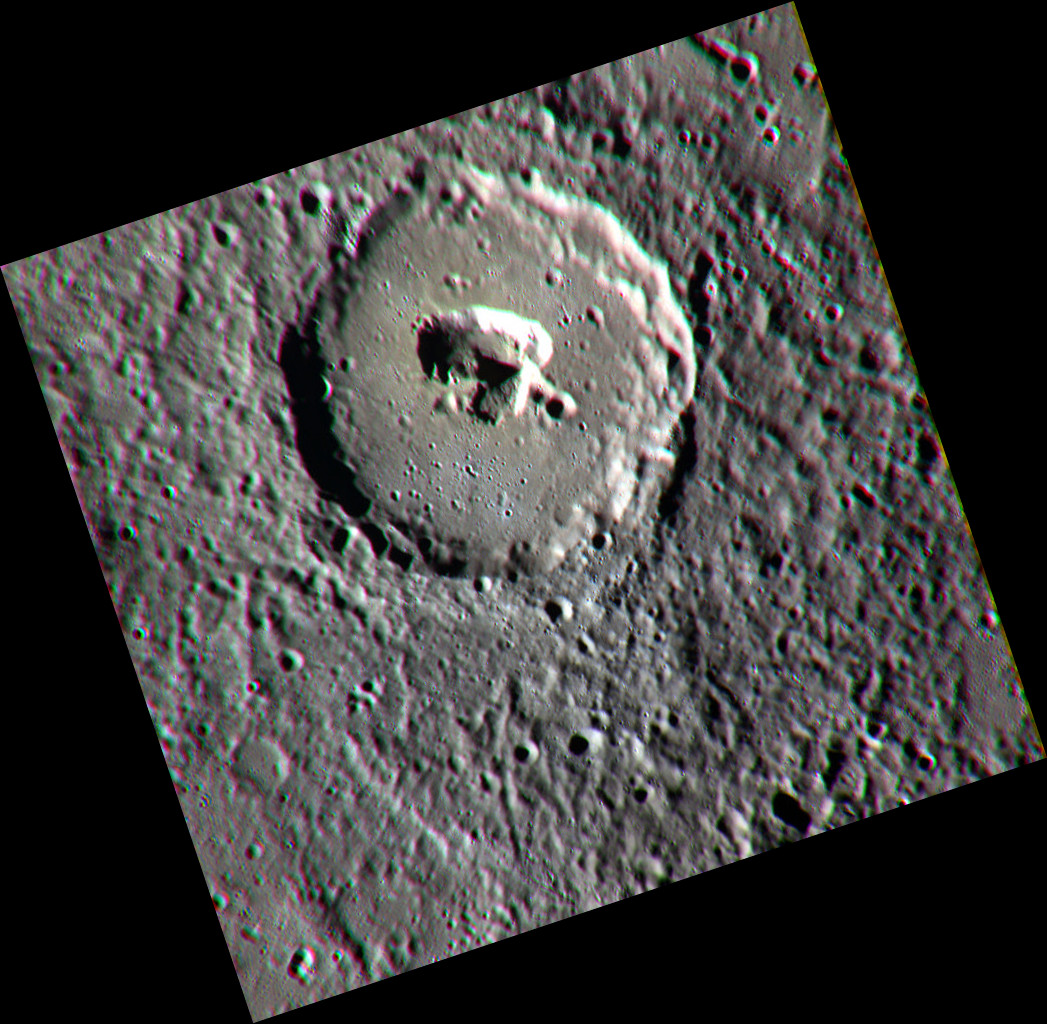
Another MESSENGER image

To Ngoc Van is a pit-floored crater on Mercury, named after the Vietnamese artist Tô Ngọc Vân. It was discovered in January 2008 during the first flyby of the planet by MESSENGER spacecraft. Its floor displays an irregularly shaped collapse feature, which is called a central pit. The size of the pit is 21 × 10 km. Such a feature may have resulted from collapse of a magma chamber underlying the central part of the crater. The collapse feature is an analog of Earth's volcanic calderas. The pit may be evidence of explosive volcanism on the floor of the crater.

To the southeast of To Ngoc Van is Bruegel crater, and to the northwest is Burns. To the northeast is a large (329 km diameter), unnamed crater of Tolstojan in age.
