= List of craters on Mercury =

- Mercurian: 414 craters (7.9%)
- Lunar: 1,624 craters (31.1%)
- Martian: 1,092 craters (20.9%)
- Venusian: 900 craters (17.2%)
- Others: 1,198 craters (22.9%)
Distribution of named craters in the Solar System as of 2017 (Note: The total number of features also includes names that have been dropped or not yet unapproved by IAU's Working Group for Planetary System Nomenclature (WGPSN))

This is a list of named craters on Mercury, the innermost planet of the Solar System (for other features, see list of geological features on Mercury). Most Mercurian craters are named after famous writers, artists and composers. According to the rules by IAU's Working Group for Planetary System Nomenclature, all new craters must be named after an artist that was famous for more than fifty years, and dead for more than three years, before the date they are named. Craters larger than 250 km in diameter are referred to as "basins" (also see § Terminology).

As of 2025, there are 444 named Mercurian craters, a small fraction of the total number of named Solar System craters, most of which are lunar, Martian and Venerian craters.

Other, non-planetary bodies with numerous named craters include Callisto (141), Ganymede (131), Rhea (128), Vesta (90), Ceres (90), Dione (73), Iapetus (58), Enceladus (53), Tethys (50) and Europa (41). For a full list, see List of craters in the Solar System.

Map of named mercury craters as of 2022

== A ==
| Crater | Coordinates | Diameter (km) | Approval Year | Eponym | Ref |
|---|---|---|---|---|---|
| Abedin | 61.73°N 10.66°W | 116.23 | 2009 | Zainul Abedin, Bangladeshi painter | WGPSN |
| Abu Nuwas | 17.63°N 21.19°W | 117 | 1976 | Abu Nuwas, Arabic poet | WGPSN |
| Africanus Horton | 50.96°S 41.19°W | 140 | 1976 | Africanus Horton, Sierra Leonean writer | WGPSN |
| Ahmad Baba | 58.33°N 128.35°W | 126 | 1979 | Ahmad Baba al Massufi, West African writer | WGPSN |
| Ailey | 45.58°N 177.92°E | 23 | 2012 | Alvin Ailey, American choreographer | WGPSN |
| Aksakov | 34.71°N 78.74°W | 174 | 2012 | Sergey Aksakov, Russian author | WGPSN |
| Akutagawa | 48.25°N 141.09°W | 106 | 2015 | Ryūnosuke Akutagawa, Japanese writer | WGPSN |
| Al-Akhtal | 59.38°N 99.71°W | 94.29 | 1985 | Akhtal, Arab poet | WGPSN |
| Alencar | 63.64°S 103.78°W | 106 | 1979 | José de Alencar, Brazilian novelist | WGPSN |
| Al-Hamadhani | 39.19°N 91.76°W | 164 | 1979 | Badi' az-Zaman al-Hamadhani, Arab writer | WGPSN |
| Al-Jāhiz | 1.36°N 21.76°W | 83 | 1976 | Al-Jahiz, Arab author | WGPSN |
| Alver | 66.97°S 77.25°E | 151 | 2013 | Betti Alver, Estonian poet | WGPSN |
| Amaral | 26.49°S 117.82°E | 105 | 2008 | Tarsila do Amaral, Brazilian artist | WGPSN |
| Amru Al-Qays | 12.43°N 176.11°W | 47 | 1976 | Imru Al-Qays Ibn Hujr, Arabic poet | WGPSN |
| Andal | 47.52°S 37.71°W | 109 | 1976 | Aandaal, Tamil writer | WGPSN |
| Aneirin | 27.47°S 2.68°W | 467 | 2014 | Aneirin, Welsh poet (6th century) | WGPSN |
| Angelou | 80.32°N 66.71°W | 18 | 2019 | Maya Angelou, American author and poet | WGPSN |
| Anguissola | 80.69°N 217.35°W | 35 | 2017 | Sofonisba Anguissola, Italian painter | WGPSN |
| Anyte | 79.5°N 210.67°W | 20 | 2017 | Anyte of Tegea, Greek poet | WGPSN |
| Apollodorus | 30.54°N 163.28°E | 41 | 2008 | Apollodorus of Damascus, Ancient Greek architect | WGPSN |
| Aristoxenus | 83.93°N 17.46°W | 52 | 1979 | Aristoxenus, Ancient Greek writer | WGPSN |
| Asawa | 27.26°N 315.28°W | 130 | 2024 | Ruth Aiko Asawa, Japanese-American sculptor | WGPSN |
| Aśvaghoṣa | 10.61°N 21.49°W | 88 | 1976 | Aśvaghoṣa, Sanskrit, poet | WGPSN |
| Atget | 25.57°N 166.38°E | 100 | 2008 | Eugène Atget, French photographer | WGPSN |

back to top

== B ==
| Crater | Coordinates | Diameter (km) | Approval Year | Eponym | Ref |
|---|---|---|---|---|---|
| Bach | 69.86°S 103.01°W | 214.29 | 1976 | Johann Sebastian Bach, German composer | WGPSN |
| Bagryana | 3.89°S 283.73°W | 101 | 2015 | Elisaveta Bagryana, Bulgarian poet | WGPSN |
| Balagtas | 22.56°S 13.9°W | 104 | 1976 | Francisco Balagtas, Filipino poet | WGPSN |
| Balanchine | 38.47°N 175.52°E | 38 | 2012 | George Balanchine, Georgian choreographer | WGPSN |
| Baranauskas | 50.73°N 39.76°W | 36 | 2015 | Antanas Baranauskas, Lithuanian poet | WGPSN |
| Barney | 11.69°S 59.71°E | 29 | 2013 | Natalie Clifford Barney, American-French playwright, poet, and novelist | WGPSN |
| Balzac | 10.62°N 144.67°W | 67 | 1976 | Honoré de Balzac, French writer | WGPSN |
| Bartók | 29.22°S 135.06°W | 118 | 1979 | Béla Bartók, Hungarian composer | WGPSN |
| Barma | 40.93°S 163.49°W | 123 | 1982 | Postnik "Barma" Yakovlev, Russian architect | WGPSN |
| Bashō | 32.39°S 170.45°W | 75 | 1979 | Matsuo Bashō, Japanese poet | WGPSN |
| Bechet | 83.08°N 93.66°W | 17.6 | 2013 | Sidney Bechet, American jazz musician and composer | WGPSN |
| Beckett | 40.2°S 111.29°E | 60 | 2008 | Clarice Beckett, Australian painter | WGPSN |
| Beethoven | 20.86°S 124.21°W | 630 | 1976 | Ludwig van Beethoven, German composer | WGPSN |
| Bek | 21.16°N 50.99°W | 32 | 2010 | Bek, Egyptian sculptor | WGPSN |
| Belinskij | 77.09°S 103.92°W | 70.67 | 1985 | Vissarion Belinsky, Russian literary critic | WGPSN |
| Bellini | 33.77°S 272.83°W | 45 | 2019 | Giovanni Bellini, Italian painter | WGPSN |
| Bello | 18.87°S 120.18°W | 139 | 1976 | Andrés Bello, Venezuelan writer | WGPSN |
| Benoit | 7.48°N 104.35°E | 40 | 2009 | Rigaud Benoit, Haitian artist | WGPSN |
| Berkel | 13.73°S 26.81°E | 23 | 2009 | Sabri Berkel, Turkish painter | WGPSN |
| Berlioz | 79.33°N 38.83°E | 31.44 | 2013 | Hector Berlioz, French composer | WGPSN |
| Bernini | 80.32°S 140.97°W | 168.13 | 1976 | Gian Lorenzo Bernini, Italian sculptor | WGPSN |
| Berry | 70.57°N 247.27°W | 25 | 2020 | Chuck Berry, American singer and songwriter | WGPSN |
| Bilokur | 0.79°S 108.33°W | 67 | 2024 | Kateryna Bilokur, Ukrainian painter | WGPSN |
| Bjornson | 73.11°N 113.99°W | 75.93 | 1985 | Bjørnstjerne Bjørnson, Norwegian poet | WGPSN |
| Boccaccio | 80.99°S 23.01°W | 151.95 | 1976 | Giovanni Boccaccio, Italian writer | WGPSN |
| Boethius | 0.98°S 73.64°W | 114 | 1976 | Anicius Manlius Severinus Boethius, Roman philosopher | WGPSN |
| Botticelli | 63.63°N 112.35°W | 136.35 | 1979 | Sandro Botticelli, Italian artist | WGPSN |
| Boznańska | 59.64°N 40.75°W | 72 | 2015 | Olga Boznańska, Polish painter | WGPSN |
| Brahms | 58.32°N 177.36°W | 100 | 1979 | Johannes Brahms, German composer | WGPSN |
| Bramante | 47.23°S 61.55°W | 156 | 1976 | Donato Bramante, Italian architect | WGPSN |
| Brontë | 38.39°N 127.06°W | 68 | 1976 | The Brontë family, English writers and artists | WGPSN |
| Brooks | 45.22°S 168.02°W | 34 | 2015 | Gwendolyn Brooks, American poet and novelist | WGPSN |
| Bruegel | 49.73°N 109.46°W | 72 | 1985 | Pieter Bruegel the Elder, Flemish painter | WGPSN |
| Brunelleschi | 8.94°S 22.51°W | 128.57 | 1976 | Filippo Brunelleschi, Italian architect | WGPSN |
| Bunin | 84.47°N 141.76°W | 37 | 2019 | Ivan Bunin, Russian author | WGPSN |
| Burke | 85.91°N 171.56°W | 28.5 | 2015 | Billie Burke, American actress | WGPSN |
| Burns | 54.1°N 117.37°W | 43 | 1985 | Robert Burns, Scottish poet | WGPSN |
| Byron | 8.44°S 33°W | 106.58 | 1976 | Lord Byron, English poet | WGPSN |

back to top

== C ==
| Crater | Coordinates | Diameter (km) | Approval Year | Eponym | Ref |
|---|---|---|---|---|---|
| Calder | 3.51°N 12.75°E | 24 | 2013 | Alexander Calder, American sculptor | WGPSN |
| Callicrates | 66.51°S 30.37°W | 68 | 1976 | Kallicrates, Ancient Greek architect | WGPSN |
| Calvino | 3.99°S 56.03°W | 67 | 2009 | Italo Calvino, Italian writer | WGPSN |
| Camões | 71.42°S 68.39°W | 70 | 1976 | Luís de Camões, Portuguese writer | WGPSN |
| Canova | 25.6°N 3.71°W | 46 | 2018 | Antonio Canova, Italian sculptor | WGPSN |
| Capote | 21.1°S 72.41°E | 88 | 2013 | Truman Capote, American Author | WGPSN |
| Caravaggio | 3.18°N 87.24°E | 185 | 2013 | Michelangelo Merisi Caravaggio, Italian painter | WGPSN |
| Carducci | 36.54°S 90.39°W | 108.19 | 1976 | Giosuè Carducci, Italian poet | WGPSN |
| Carleton | 52.2°S 306.6°W | 177 | 2018 | William Carleton, Irish writer | WGPSN |
| Carolan | 83.88°N 31.77°E | 24.34 | 2015 | Turlough Carolan, Irish composer and performer | WGPSN |
| Caruso | 2.33°S 76.36°W | 31 | 2013 | Enrico Caruso, Italian singer | WGPSN |
| Carvalho | 26.82°N 51.61°W | 90 | | Beth Carvalho, Brazilian musician | WGPSN |
| Castiglione | 40.87°S 87.96°E | 80 | 2015 | Giuseppe Castiglione, Italian painter | WGPSN |
| Catullus | 21.9°N 67.55°W | 100.2 | 2012 | Gaius Valerius Catullus, Roman poet | WGPSN |
| Cervantes | 76.09°S 124.26°W | 213.16 | 1976 | Miguel de Cervantes, Spanish writer | WGPSN |
| Cézanne | 8.47°S 123.69°W | 67 | 1985 | Paul Cézanne, French painter | WGPSN |
| Chaikovskij | 7.86°N 50.93°W | 171 | 1976 | Pyotr Ilyich Tchaikovsky, Russian composer | WGPSN |
| Chao Meng-Fu | 88.42°S 156.36°W | 140.73 | 1976 | Zhao Mengfu, Chinese artist | WGPSN |
| Chekhov | 36.2°S 61.23°W | 194 | 1976 | Anton Chekhov, Russian playwright and writer | WGPSN |
| Chesterton | 88.51°N 126.9°W | 37.23 | 2012 | Gilbert Keith Chesterton, English author | WGPSN |
| Chiang Kʻui | 14.71°N 102.8°W | 41 | 1976 | Jiang Kui, Chinese poet | WGPSN |
| Chŏng Chʼŏl | 46.87°N 117.31°W | 143 | 1979 | Chŏng Ch'ŏl, Korean poet | WGPSN |
| Chopin | 65.45°S 123.4°W | 131 | 1976 | Frédéric Chopin, Polish composer | WGPSN |
| Chu Ta | 2.04°N 105.66°W | 100 | 1976 | Zhu Da, Chinese painter | WGPSN |
| Codesido | 68.19°S 206.99°W | 64 | 2024 | Julia Codesido, Peruvian painter | WGPSN |
| Coleridge | 55.67°S 66.6°W | 112 | 1976 | Samuel Taylor Coleridge, English poet | WGPSN |
| Copland | 37.63°N 72.99°E | 208 | 2010 | Aaron Copland, American composer | WGPSN |
| Copley | 38.63°S 86.01°W | 34 | 1976 | John Singleton Copley, American painter | WGPSN |
| Couperin | 29.74°N 151.94°W | 80 | 1979 | The Couperin family of French musicians | WGPSN |
| Cunningham | 30.41°N 157.07°E | 37 | 2008 | Imogen Cunningham, American photographer | WGPSN |

back to top

== D ==
| Crater | Coordinates | Diameter (km) | Approval Year | Eponym | Ref |
|---|---|---|---|---|---|
| Dali | 45.16°N 119.74°E | 176 | 2008 | Salvador Dalí, Spanish painter | WGPSN |
| Damer | 36.36°N 115.81°W | 60 | 2013 | Anne Seymour Damer, English sculptor | WGPSN |
| Darío | 26.28°S 9.51°W | 151 | 1976 | Rubén Darío, Nicaraguan writer | WGPSN |
| David | 17.66°S 67.87°E | 23 | 2013 | Jacques-Louis David, French painter | WGPSN |
| de Graft | 22.05°N 1.89°E | 68 | 2009 | Joe de Graft, Ghanaian playwright | WGPSN |
| Debussy | 33.95°S 12.54°E | 81 | 2010 | Claude Debussy, French composer | WGPSN |
| Degas | 37.08°N 127.34°W | 54 | 1979 | Edgar Degas, French artist | WGPSN |
| Delacroix | 44.32°S 129.51°W | 158 | 1979 | Eugène Delacroix, French artist | WGPSN |
| Derain | 9°S 19.7°E | 167 | 2009 | André Derain, French artist | WGPSN |
| Derzhavin | 45.6°N 36.93°W | 156 | 1979 | Gavril Romanovich Derzhavin, Russian poet | WGPSN |
| Despréz | 81.08°N 101.25°W | 47.05 | 1979 | Josquin des Prez, Franco-Flemish composer | WGPSN |
| Dickens | 73.26°S 155.96°W | 77.31 | 1976 | Charles Dickens, English novelist | WGPSN |
| Disney | 68.15°S 99.8°E | 113 | 2012 | Walt Disney, American animator | WGPSN |
| Dominici | 1.29°N 36.49°W | 20 | 2010 | Maria de Dominici, Maltese painter | WGPSN |
| Donelaitis | 52.96°S 38.42°E | 85 | 2013 | Kristijonas Donelaitis, Lithuanian poet | WGPSN |
| Donne | 2.92°N 14.05°W | 86 | 1976 | John Donne, English poet | WGPSN |
| Dostoevskij | 44.73°S 178.11°W | 430.06 | 1979 | Fyodor Dostoyevsky, Russian novelist | WGPSN |
| Dowland | 53.56°S 179.3°E | 158 | 1979 | John Dowland, English composer | WGPSN |
| Driscoll | 30.58°N 33.58°W | 30 | 2015 | Clara Driscoll, American artist | WGPSN |
| Duccio | 58.23°N 52.42°W | 132 | 2013 | Duccio di Buoninsegna, Italian painter | WGPSN |
| Du Fu | 25°N 93.66°W | 33 | 2015 | Du Fu, Chinese artist | WGPSN |
| Dürer | 21.51°N 118.98°W | 195 | 1976 | Albrecht Dürer, German artist | WGPSN |
| Dvorák | 9.4°S 12.13°W | 75 | 1976 | Antonín Dvořák, Czech composer | WGPSN |

back to top

== E ==
| Crater | Coordinates | Diameter (km) | Approval Year | Eponym | Ref |
|---|---|---|---|---|---|
| Eastman | 9.52°N 125.76°E | 67 | 2009 | Charles Eastman, Sioux author | WGPSN |
| Echegaray | 43.48°N 20.22°W | 63 | 1985 | José Echegaray, Spanish dramatist | WGPSN |
| Egonu | 67.15°N 61.48°E | 25 | 2012 | Uzo Egonu, Nigerian artist | WGPSN |
| Eitoku | 21.8°S 157.18°W | 101 | 1976 | Kanō Eitoku, Japanese artist | WGPSN |
| El Husseini | 75.34°S 333.34°W | 87 | 2024 | Jumana El Husseini, Palestinian painter and sculptor | WGPSN |
| Ellington | 12.88°S 26.1°E | 216 | 2012 | Duke Ellington, American musician | WGPSN |
| Eminescu | 10.66°N 114.21°E | 129 | 2008 | Mihai Eminescu, Romanian poet | WGPSN |
| Enheduanna | 48.34°N 33.59°W | 105 | 2015 | Enheduanna, Sumerian poet | WGPSN |
| Enwonwu | 10.01°S 121.96°E | 38 | 2008 | Ben Enwonwu, Nigerian painter | WGPSN |
| Ensor | 82.32°N 17.53°W | 24.92 | 2013 | James Ensor, Belgian painter | WGPSN |
| Equiano | 40°S 30.59°W | 102 | 1976 | Olaudah Equiano, Benin writer | WGPSN |
| Erté | 27.44°N 117.33°W | 48.5 | 2013 | Erté, Russian-born French artist | WGPSN |

back to top

== F ==
| Crater | Coordinates | Diameter (km) | Approval Year | Eponym | Ref |
|---|---|---|---|---|---|
| Faulkner | 8.08°N 76.97°E | 168 | 2012 | William Faulkner, American author | WGPSN |
| Fet | 4.72°S 179.78°E | 79 | 1985 | Afanasy Fet, Russian poet | WGPSN |
| Firdousi | 3.47°N 65.32°E | 98 | 2010 | Hakim Ferdowsi, Persian poet | WGPSN |
| Flaubert | 13.83°S 72.7°W | 95 | 1985 | Gustave Flaubert, French author | WGPSN |
| Flaiano | 21.29°S 76.73°W | 43 | 2013 | Ennio Flaiano, Italian author | WGPSN |
| Fonteyn | 32.82°N 95.51°E | 29 | 2012 | Margot Fonteyn, English ballet dancer | WGPSN |
| Freire | 73.36°S 214.46°W | 51 | 2024 | María Freire, Uruguayan painter | WGPSN |
| Fuller | 82.63°N 42.65°W | 26.97 | 2013 | Richard Buckminster Fuller, American engineer and architect | WGPSN |
| Futabatei | 16.05°S 83.52°W | 57 | 1976 | Futabatei Shimei, Japanese author | WGPSN |

back to top

== G ==
| Crater | Coordinates | Diameter (km) | Approval Year | Eponym | Ref |
|---|---|---|---|---|---|
| Gainsborough | 35.73°S 175.48°E | 95 | 1985 | Thomas Gainsborough, English painter | WGPSN |
| Gaudí | 76.9°N 69.16°E | 81 | 2012 | Antoni Gaudí i Cornet, Spanish Catalan architect | WGPSN |
| Gauguin | 66.36°N 100.01°W | 70 | 1979 | Paul Gauguin, French artist | WGPSN |
| Geddes | 27.17°N 29.72°W | 84 | 2010 | Wilhelmina Geddes, Irish stained glass artist | WGPSN |
| Ghiberti | 48.55°S 80.15°W | 110 | 1976 | Lorenzo Ghiberti, Italian sculptor | WGPSN |
| Giambologna | 42.58°S 124.11°W | 69 | 2013 | Giambologna, Flemish sculptor | WGPSN |
| Gibran | 35.73°N 111.44°W | 106 | 2009 | Kahlil Gibran, Lebanese American poet and artist | WGPSN |
| Giotto | 12.46°N 56.48°W | 144 | 1976 | Giotto di Bondone, Italian painter | WGPSN |
| Glinka | 14.83°N 112.55°W | 89 | 2008 | Mikhail Glinka, Russian composer | WGPSN |
| Gluck | 37.95°N 18.78°W | 100 | 1979 | Christoph Willibald Gluck, Austrian composer | WGPSN |
| Goethe | 81.1°N 51.03°W | 317.17 | 1979 | Johann Wolfgang von Goethe, German writer | WGPSN |
| Gogol | 28.26°S 147.46°W | 79 | 1985 | Nikolai Gogol, Russian playwright | WGPSN |
| Gordimer | 87.73°N 170.9°W | 58 | 2019 | Nadine Gordimer, South African writer | WGPSN |
| Goya | 6.79°S 152.29°W | 138 | 1976 | Francisco Goya, Spanish artist | WGPSN |
| Grainger | 44.09°S 104.81°E | 113 | 2012 | Percy Grainger, Australian composer | WGPSN |
| Grieg | 52.49°N 15.36°W | 59 | 1985 | Edvard Grieg, Norwegian composer | WGPSN |
| Grotell | 71.09°N 31.63°W | 48.25 | 2012 | Maija Grotell, Finnish and American ceramist | WGPSN |
| Guido d'Arezzo | 38.41°S 18.53°W | 58 | 1976 | Guido of Arezzo, Italian music theorist | WGPSN |

back to top

== H ==
| Crater | Coordinates | Diameter (km) | Approval Year | Eponym | Ref |
|---|---|---|---|---|---|
| Hafiz | 19.5°N 79.56°E | 280 | 2014 | Hafiz of Shiraz, Persian poet | WGPSN |
| Halim | 48.87°N 100.94°W | 44 | 2024 | Tahia Halim, Egyptian painter | WGPSN |
| Hals | 54.96°S 114.99°W | 93 | 1985 | Frans Hals, Dutch painter | WGPSN |
| Han Kan | 72.13°S 146.4°W | 50 | 1985 | Han Gan, Chinese painter | WGPSN |
| Handel | 3.53°N 34.38°W | 138 | 1976 | George Frideric Handel, German composer | WGPSN |
| Harunobu | 14.88°N 140.93°W | 107 | 1976 | Suzuki Harunobu, Japanese artist | WGPSN |
| Hauptmann | 23.7°S 179.59°E | 118 | 1985 | Gerhart Hauptmann, German playwright | WGPSN |
| Hawthorne | 51.31°S 115.34°W | 120 | 1979 | Nathaniel Hawthorne, American novelist | WGPSN |
| Haydn | 27.22°S 71.64°W | 251 | 1976 | Joseph Haydn, Austrian composer | WGPSN |
| Heaney | 33.77°S 237.71°W | 125 | 2017 | Seamus Heaney, Irish poet and playwright | WGPSN |
| Heine | 32.46°N 124.88°W | 73 | 1979 | Heinrich Heine, German poet | WGPSN |
| Hemingway | 17.38°N 3.13°W | 126 | 2009 | Ernest Hemingway, American writer | WGPSN |
| Henri | 79.68°N 152.98°E | 163.8 | 2012 | Robert Henri, American painter | WGPSN |
| Hesiod | 58.27°S 34.25°W | 101 | 1976 | Hesiod, Ancient Greek poet | WGPSN |
| Hiroshige | 13.34°S 26.96°W | 138 | 1976 | Andō Hiroshige, Japanese artist | WGPSN |
| Hitomaro | 16.07°S 15.65°W | 105 | 1976 | Kakinomoto no Hitomaro, Japanese poet | WGPSN |
| Hodgkins | 29.12°N 17.97°E | 19 | 2009 | Frances Hodgkins, New Zealand painter | WGPSN |
| Hokusai | 57.84°N 16.65°E | 114 | 2010 | Katsushika Hokusai, Japanese painter | WGPSN |
| Holbein | 36.16°N 29.84°W | 115 | 1979 | Hans Holbein the Younger, German artist | WGPSN |
| Holberg | 67.37°S 59.57°W | 64 | 1976 | Ludvig Holberg, Danish writer | WGPSN |
| Holst | 17.42°S 44.96°E | 170 | 2012 | Gustav Holst, British composer | WGPSN |
| Homer | 1.3°S 36.62°W | 319 | 1976 | Homer, Greek Poet | WGPSN |
| Hopper | 12.44°S 55.96°W | 36 | 2012 | Edward Hopper, American painter | WGPSN |
| Horace | 69.34°S 50.02°W | 56 | 1976 | Horace, Roman poet | WGPSN |
| Hovnatanian | 7.68°S 172.71°E | 34 | 2008 | Hakob Hovnatanian, Armenian painter | WGPSN |
| Hugo | 39.61°N 48.49°W | 206 | 1979 | Victor Hugo, French writer | WGPSN |
| Hun Kal | 0.47°S 19.93°W | 0.93 | 1976 | '20' in the language of the Maya (serves as Mercury's a meridian reference point) | WGPSN |
| Hurley | 87.36°S 6.99°W | 67 | 2013 | Frank Hurley, Australian photographer | WGPSN |

back to top

== I ==
| Crater | Coordinates | Diameter (km) | Approval Year | Eponym | Ref |
|---|---|---|---|---|---|
| Ibsen | 24.35°S 35.89°W | 159 | 1976 | Henrik Ibsen, Norwegian playwright | WGPSN |
| Ictinus | 79.56°S 174.24°W | 58.03 | 1976 | Iktinos, Ancient Greek architect | WGPSN |
| Imhotep | 17.97°S 37.48°W | 159 | 1976 | Imhotep, Ancient Egyptian architect | WGPSN |
| Ives | 32.87°S 111.99°W | 18 | 1979 | Charles Ives, American composer | WGPSN |
| Izquierdo | 1.66°S 107.04°E | 174 | 2009 | María Izquierdo, Mexican painter | WGPSN |

back to top

== J ==
| Crater | Coordinates | Diameter (km) | Approval Year | Eponym | Ref |
|---|---|---|---|---|---|
| Janáček | 55.72°N 154.85°W | 47 | 1985 | Leoš Janáček, Czech composer | WGPSN |
| Jiménez | 81.83°N 152.31°W | 27 | 2019 | Juan Ramón Jiménez, Spanish poet and author | WGPSN |
| Jókai | 71.93°N 138.45°W | 93 | 1979 | Mór Jókai, Hungarian writer | WGPSN |
| Jobim | 32.45°N 66.88°W | 167 | 2015 | Antônio Carlos Jobim, Brazilian composer | WGPSN |
| Joplin | 38.56°S 25.51°E | 139 | 2012 | Scott Joplin, American composer | WGPSN |
| Josetsu | 83.58°N 134.93°W | 30 | 2019 | Taikō Josetsu, Japanese ink painter | WGPSN |
| Judah Ha-Levi | 10.79°N 108.01°W | 85 | 1976 | Yehuda Halevi, Spanish-Jewish writer | WGPSN |

back to top

== K ==
| Crater | Coordinates | Diameter (km) | Approval Year | Eponym | Ref |
|---|---|---|---|---|---|
| Kandinsky | 87.89°N 78.78°E | 60 | 2012 | Wassily Kandinsky, Russian painter | WGPSN |
| Karsh | 35.49°S 78.85°E | 58 | 2015 | Yousuf Karsh, Armenian-Canadian photographer | WGPSN |
| Kālidāsā | 18.21°S 179.82°W | 160 | 1976 | Kālidāsa, Sanskrit writer | WGPSN |
| Keats | 70.31°S 156.65°W | 107.85 | 1976 | John Keats, English poet | WGPSN |
| Kenkō | 21.35°S 16.16°W | 105 | 1976 | Yoshida Kenkō, Japanese writer | WGPSN |
| Kerouac | 25.21°N 129.1°E | 110 | 2015 | Jack Kerouac, American writer | WGPSN |
| Kertész | 27.37°N 146.08°E | 32 | 2008 | André Kertész, Hungarian photographer | WGPSN |
| Khansa | 58.95°S 51.94°W | 113 | 1976 | Al-Khansa, Arabic poet | WGPSN |
| Kipling | 19.37°S 72.02°E | 164 | 2010 | Rudyard Kipling, English author | WGPSN |
| Kirby | 82.96°N 151.32°W | 31 | 2019 | Jack Kirby, American illustrator | WGPSN |
| Kobro | 82.16°S 81.22°E | 54 | 2012 | Katarzyna Kobro, Polish sculptor | WGPSN |
| Kofi | 56.75°N 117.87°E | 136 | 2012 | Vincent Kofi, Ghanaian sculptor | WGPSN |
| Komeda | 82.74°S 90.47°E | 54 | 2012 | Krzysztof Komeda, Polish composer | WGPSN |
| Kōshō | 59.93°N 139.87°W | 64 | 1985 | Kōshō, Japanese sculptor | WGPSN |
| Kuan Han-Chʻing | 29.44°N 53.67°W | 143 | 1979 | Guan Hanqing, Chinese playwright | WGPSN |
| Kuiper | 11.34°S 31.32°W | 62 | 1976 | Gerard Kuiper, American astronomer | WGPSN |
| Kulthum | 50.72°N 93.53°E | 31 | 2015 | Umm Kulthum, Egyptian singer | WGPSN |
| Kunisada | 1.37°N 113.02°E | 241.45 | 2009 | Utagawa Kunisada, Japanese woodblock printmaker | WGPSN |
| Kuniyoshi | 57.87°S 37.49°W | 27 | 2014 | Utagawa Kuniyoshi, Japanese painter and printmaker | WGPSN |
| Kurosawa | 52.44°S 21.49°W | 152 | 1976 | Kinko Kurosawa, Japanese musician | WGPSN |
| Kyōsai | 25.15°N 4.86°E | 39 | 2012 | Kawanabe Kyōsai, Japanese artist | WGPSN |

back to top

== L ==
| Crater | Coordinates | Diameter (km) | Approval Year | Eponym | Ref |
|---|---|---|---|---|---|
| Lange | 6.28°N 100.47°E | 176.23 | 2009 | Dorothea Lange, American photographer | WGPSN |
| Larrocha | 43.29°N 69.83°W | 196 | 2013 | Alicia de Larrocha, Spanish pianist | WGPSN |
| Laxness | 83.27°N 50.04°W | 25.89 | 2013 | Halldór Laxness, Icelandic writer | WGPSN |
| Le Guin | 18.76°S 102.74°W | 61 | 2024 | Ursula K. Le Guin, American author | WGPSN |
| L'Engle | 86.63°S 69.62°E | 62 | 2013 | Madeleine L'Engle, American author | WGPSN |
| Lennon | 36.41°S 41.18°E | 95 | 2013 | John Lennon, former Beatles member | WGPSN |
| Lennon-Picasso Basin | 17.42°S 44.96°E | 1450 | 2018 | John Lennon and Pablo Picasso | |
| Leopardi | 72.76°S 175.16°E | 71.45 | 1976 | Giacomo Leopardi, Italian writer | WGPSN |
| Lermontov | 15.24°N 48.94°W | 166 | 1976 | Mikhail Lermontov, Russian writer | WGPSN |
| Lessing | 28.5°S 90.34°W | 95 | 1985 | Gotthold Ephraim Lessing, German dramatist | WGPSN |
| Li Chʻing-Chao | 77.96°S 71.17°W | 69 | 1976 | Li Qingzhao, Chinese writer | WGPSN |
| Li Po | 17.1°N 35.69°W | 126 | 1976 | Li Bai, Chinese poet | WGPSN |
| Liang Kʻai | 39.89°S 175.84°E | 145 | 1979 | Liang Kai, Chinese artist | WGPSN |
| Lismer | 81.51°N 166.37°E | 139.12 | 2012 | Arthur Lismer, Canadian painter | WGPSN |
| Liszt | 16.13°S 168.34°W | 79 | 1985 | Franz Liszt, Hungarian composer | WGPSN |
| Lorde | 69.12°S 49.47°W | 45 | 2022 | Audre Lorde, American writer | WGPSN |
| Lovecraft | 86.24°S 73.82°W | 51.97 | 2013 | H. P. Lovecraft, American author | WGPSN |
| Lu Hsun | 0.01°S 23.76°W | 96 | 1976 | Lu Xun, Chinese writer | WGPSN |
| Lysippus | 1.03°N 132.75°W | 155 | 1976 | Lysippos, Ancient Greek sculptor | WGPSN |

back to top

== M ==
| Crater | Coordinates | Diameter (km) | Approval Year | Eponym | Ref |
|---|---|---|---|---|---|
| Ma Chih-Yuan | 60.01°S 78.01°W | 197 | 1976 | Ma Zhiyuan, Chinese writer | WGPSN |
| Machaut | 2.05°S 82.37°W | 104 | 1976 | Guillaume de Machaut, French poet and composer | WGPSN |
| MacNicol | 68.19°S 355.95°W | 42 | 2022 | Bessie MacNicol, Scottish painter | WGPSN |
| Magritte | 72.78°S 121.63°E | 149 | 2012 | René Magritte, Belgian painter | WGPSN |
| Mahler | 19.68°S 18.82°W | 104 | 1976 | Gustav Mahler, Bohemian composer | WGPSN |
| Mansart | 72.72°N 123.36°W | 84.97 | 1979 | Jules Hardouin-Mansart, French architect | WGPSN |
| Mansur | 47.41°N 163.61°W | 95 | 1979 | Ustad Mansur, Mughal artist | WGPSN |
| March | 30.95°N 176.3°W | 83 | 1979 | Ausiàs March, Catalan poet | WGPSN |
| Mark Twain | 10.91°S 138.28°W | 142 | 1976 | Mark Twain, American novelist | WGPSN |
| Martí | 75.96°S 168.26°W | 69.48 | 1976 | José Martí, Cuban writer | WGPSN |
| Martins | 8°S 304.93°W | 12.4 | 2019 | Maria Martins, Brazilian sculptor | WGPSN |
| Martial | 68.47°N 178.33°W | 51 | 1979 | Martial, Roman poet | WGPSN |
| Matabei | 39.85°S 14.05°W | 24 | 2009 | Iwasa Matabei, Japanese painter | WGPSN |
| Matisse | 23.83°S 90.05°W | 189.04 | 1976 | Henri Matisse, French painter | WGPSN |
| Melville | 22.01°N 9.89°W | 146 | 1976 | Herman Melville, American novelist | WGPSN |
| Mena | 0.17°S 124.73°W | 15 | 1976 | Juan de Mena, Spanish poet | WGPSN |
| Mendelssohn | 70.07°N 257.45°W | 291 | 2012 | Felix Mendelssohn, German composer | WGPSN |
| Mendes Pinto | 61.65°S 17.57°W | 192 | 1976 | Fernão Mendes Pinto, Portuguese writer | WGPSN |
| Michelangelo | 44.92°S 109.78°W | 229.71 | 1979 | Michelangelo, Italian artist | WGPSN |
| Mickiewicz | 23.15°N 103.23°W | 103 | 1976 | Adam Mickiewicz, Polish writer | WGPSN |
| Milton | 26.1°S 175.03°W | 180.85 | 1976 | John Milton, English poet | WGPSN |
| Mistral | 4.7°N 54.67°W | 102 | 1976 | Gabriela Mistral, Chilean poet | WGPSN |
| Mofolo | 37.68°S 28.22°W | 103 | 1976 | Thomas Mofolo, Lesotho writer | WGPSN |
| Molière | 15.4°N 17.71°W | 139 | 1976 | Molière, French playwright | WGPSN |
| Monet | 44.23°N 9.77°W | 203 | 1979 | Claude Monet, French artist | WGPSN |
| Monk | 66.08°N 63.81°E | 12 | 2013 | Thelonious Monk, American jazz musician | WGPSN |
| Monteverdi | 64.49°N 81.01°W | 134 | 1979 | Claudio Monteverdi, Italian composer | WGPSN |
| Moody | 13.21°S 144.85°E | 83 | 2008 | Ronald Moody, Jamaican painter | WGPSN |
| Morrison | 79.66°N 232.57°E | 35 | 2022 | Toni Morrison; American author | WGPSN |
| Mozart | 7.75°N 169.41°E | 241 | 1976 | Wolfgang Amadeus Mozart, Austrian composer | WGPSN |
| Munch | 40.48°N 152.82°E | 57 | 2008 | Edvard Munch, Norwegian painter | WGPSN |
| Munkácsy | 21.95°N 101.14°E | 193 | 2009 | Mihály Munkácsy, Hungarian painter | WGPSN |
| Murasaki | 12.54°S 30.4°W | 132 | 1976 | Murasaki Shikibu, Japanese writer | WGPSN |
| Mussorgskij | 32.82°N 97.65°W | 115 | 1979 | Modest Mussorgsky, Russian composer | WGPSN |
| Myron | 71.21°N 84.86°W | 25 | 1979 | Myron, Ancient Greek sculptor | WGPSN |

back to top

== N ==
| Crater | Coordinates | Diameter (km) | Approval Year | Eponym | Ref |
|---|---|---|---|---|---|
| Nabokov | 14.56°S 55.76°E | 166 | 2012 | Vladimir Nabokov, Russian and American writer | WGPSN |
| Nairne | 70.34°S 1.59°E | 56 | 2022 | Carolina Nairne, Scottish songwriter | WGPSN |
| Namatjira | 58.82°N 33.04°W | 34 | 2015 | Albert Namatjira, Australian Aboriginal artist | WGPSN |
| Nampeyo | 40.33°S 49.96°W | 49 | 1976 | Nampeyo, Hopi potter | WGPSN |
| Navoi | 58.82°N 160.41°E | 69 | 2008 | Ali-Shir Nava'i, Uzbek poet | WGPSN |
| Nāwahī | 35.88°N 145.26°E | 38 | 2008 | Joseph Nāwahī, Hawaiian painter | WGPSN |
| Neruda | 52.66°S 125.79°E | 112 | 2008 | Jan Neruda, Czech poet and writer, and Johann Baptist Georg Neruda, Czech composer | WGPSN |
| Nervo | 42.7°N 179.89°W | 66 | 1979 | Amado Nervo, Mexican poet | WGPSN |
| Neumann | 37.22°S 34.56°W | 122 | 1976 | Johann Balthasar Neumann, German architect | WGPSN |
| Nizāmī | 70.46°N 166.71°W | 77 | 1979 | Nizami, Persian poet | WGPSN |
| Nureyev | 11.68°N 173.13°W | 16 | 2012 | Rudolf Nureyev, Soviet and British ballet dancer | WGPSN |

back to top

== O ==
| Crater | Coordinates | Diameter (km) | Approval Year | Eponym | Ref |
|---|---|---|---|---|---|
| Ōkyo | 70.05°S 74.66°W | 66 | 1985 | Maruyama Ōkyo, Japanese painter | WGPSN |
| Oskison | 60.36°N 145.24°E | 122 | 2008 | John Milton Oskison, Cherokee author | WGPSN |
| Ovid | 69.77°S 20.23°W | 41 | 1976 | Ovid, Roman poet | WGPSN |

back to top

== P ==
| Crater | Coordinates | Diameter (km) | Approval Year | Eponym | Ref |
|---|---|---|---|---|---|
| Pahinui | 28.16°S 213.21°W | 54 | 2013 | Gabby Pahinui, Hawaiian slack-key guitarist and singer | WGPSN |
| Pasch | 46.12°N 134.75°E | 37 | 2012 | Ulrika Pasch, Swedish painter | WGPSN |
| Petipa | 11.54°N 21.05°E | 12 | 2012 | Marius Petipa, French and Russian choreographer and dancer | WGPSN |
| Petőfi | 83.55°S 119.35°E | 61 | 2013 | Sándor Petőfi, Hungarian poet | WGPSN |
| Petrarch | 30.52°S 26.29°W | 167 | 1976 | Petrarch, Italian poet | WGPSN |
| Petronius | 86.06°N 40.51°W | 36 | 2012 | Petronius, Roman author | WGPSN |
| Phidias | 8.97°N 149.73°W | 168 | 1976 | Phidias, Ancient Greek artist and architect | WGPSN |
| Philoxenus | 8.68°S 111.75°W | 87 | 1976 | Philoxenus of Cythera, Ancient Greek poet | WGPSN |
| Piazzolla | 34.38°N 0.42°W | 38 | 2024 | Astor Piazzolla, Argentinian tango composer | WGPSN |
| Picasso | 3.44°N 50.24°E | 134 | 2010 | Pablo Picasso, Spanish painter | WGPSN |
| Pigalle | 37.65°S 9.64°W | 153 | 1976 | Jean-Baptiste Pigalle, French sculptor | WGPSN |
| Plath | 37.86°N 38.84°W | 35 | 2015 | Sylvia Plath, American poet | WGPSN |
| Po Chü-I | 6.94°S 165.28°W | 70 | 1976 | Bai Juyi, Chinese poet | WGPSN |
| Po Ya | 45.92°S 20.17°W | 101 | 1976 | Bo Ya, Chinese musician | WGPSN |
| Poe | 43.76°N 159.1°E | 77 | 2008 | Edgar Allan Poe, American poet | WGPSN |
| Polygnotus | 0.13°S 69.26°W | 124 | 1976 | Polygnotus, Ancient Greek painter | WGPSN |
| Popova | 34.72°S 66.73°W | 34 | 2012 | Lyubov Popova, Russian painter and designer | WGPSN |
| Praxiteles | 27.11°N 60.28°W | 198 | 1979 | Praxiteles, Ancient Greek sculptor | WGPSN |
| Prokofiev | 85.77°N 62.92°E | 112 | 2012 | Sergei Prokofiev, Russian composer | WGPSN |
| Proust | 19.56°N 47.59°W | 145 | 1976 | Marcel Proust, French novelist | WGPSN |
| Puccini | 65.39°S 45.32°W | 76 | 1976 | Giacomo Puccini, Italian composer | WGPSN |
| Purcell | 80.43°N 152.21°W | 87.67 | 1979 | Henry Purcell, English composer | WGPSN |
| Pushkin | 65.79°S 20.73°W | 232 | 1976 | Alexander Pushkin, Russian poet | WGPSN |

back to top

== Q ==
| Crater | Coordinates | Diameter (km) | Approval Year | Eponym | Ref |
|---|---|---|---|---|---|
| Qi Baishi | 4.31°S 164.37°E | 15 | 2008 | Qi Baishi, Chinese painter | WGPSN |
| Qiu Ying | 82.67°N 85.7°W | 20 | 2012 | Qiu Ying, Chinese painter | WGPSN |

back to top

== R ==
| Crater | Coordinates | Diameter (km) | Approval Year | Eponym | Ref |
|---|---|---|---|---|---|
| Rabelais | 60.53°S 61.81°W | 154 | 1976 | François Rabelais, French writer | WGPSN |
| Rachmaninoff | 27.66°N 57.37°E | 305 | 2010 | Sergei Rachmaninoff, Russian composer | WGPSN |
| Raden Saleh | 2.07°N 158.83°E | 23 | 2008 | Raden Saleh, Javanese painter | WGPSN |
| Raditladi | 27.15°N 119.06°E | 258 | 2008 | Leetile Disang Raditladi, Botswanan writer | WGPSN |
| Rajnis | 4.36°N 96.21°W | 80 | 1976 | Rainis, Latvian writer | WGPSN |
| Remarque | 84.94°N 6.46°W | 25.9 | 2013 | Erich Maria Remarque, German author | WGPSN |
| Rameau | 54.58°S 37.24°W | 58 | 1976 | Jean-Philippe Rameau, French composer | WGPSN |
| Raphael | 20.42°S 76.35°W | 342 | 1976 | Raphael, Italian artist | WGPSN |
| Ravel | 12.01°S 38.19°W | 78 | 1985 | Maurice Ravel, French composer | WGPSN |
| Rembrandt | 32.89°S 87.87°E | 716 | 2009 | Rembrandt, Dutch artist | WGPSN |
| Renoir | 18.34°S 52.01°W | 220 | 1976 | Pierre-Auguste Renoir, French artist | WGPSN |
| Repin | 19.12°S 63.33°W | 95 | 1976 | Ilya Yefimovich Repin, Russian artist | WGPSN |
| Riemenschneider | 52.75°S 99.95°W | 183 | 1979 | Tilman Riemenschneider, German sculptor | WGPSN |
| Rilke | 44.81°S 12.57°W | 82 | 1976 | Rainer Maria Rilke, German poet | WGPSN |
| Rimbaud | 63.62°S 148.9°W | 78 | 1985 | Arthur Rimbaud, French poet | WGPSN |
| Rikyū | 79.91°N 22.74°W | 22.4 | 2013 | Sen no Rikyū, Japanese tea master | WGPSN |
| Rivera | 69.29°N 32.18°E | 40 | 2015 | Diego Rivera, Mexican painter | WGPSN |
| Rizal | 82.48°N 146.98°W | 64 | 2019 | José Rizal, Filipino writer | WGPSN |
| Rodin | 21.72°N 18.89°W | 230 | 1976 | Auguste Rodin, French sculptor | WGPSN |
| Roerich | 84.39°S 58.94°W | 111.67 | 2013 | Nicholas Roerich, Russian painter | WGPSN |
| Rubens | 60.58°N 77.99°W | 158 | 1979 | Peter Paul Rubens, French artist | WGPSN |
| Rublev | 15.12°S 157.08°W | 129 | 1976 | Andrei Rublev, Russian icon painter | WGPSN |
| Rūdaki | 3.97°S 51.76°W | 124 | 1976 | Rudaki, Persian poet | WGPSN |
| Rude | 33.22°S 79.29°W | 68 | 1985 | François Rude, French sculptor | WGPSN |
| Rūmī | 24.2°S 105.3°W | 75 | 1985 | Mawlana Rumi, Persian poet | WGPSN |
| Rustaveli | 52.41°N 82.74°E | 200 | 2012 | Shota Rustaveli, Georgian poet | WGPSN |
| Ruysch | 10.7°S 94.12°E | 64 | 2013 | Rachel Ruysch, Netherland painter | WGPSN |

back to top

== S ==
| Crater | Coordinates | Diameter (km) | Approval Year | Eponym | Ref |
|---|---|---|---|---|---|
| Sadī | 79.24°S 51.26°W | 66.54 | 1976 | Saadi, Persian poet | WGPSN |
| Saikaku | 71.96°N 177.97°W | 64 | 1979 | Ihara Saikaku, Japanese poet | WGPSN |
| Sander | 42.43°N 154.56°E | 47 | 2008 | August Sander, German photographer | WGPSN |
| Sanai | 13.37°S 6.99°W | 490 | 2014 | Sanai, Persian poet | WGPSN |
| Sapkota | 86.09°N 132.79°W | 27.4 | 2015 | Mahananda Sapkota, Nepalese poet | WGPSN |
| Sarmiento | 29.27°S 170.42°E | 95 | 1979 | Domingo Faustino Sarmiento, Argentinian writer | WGPSN |
| Savage | 8.59°S 93.41°E | 93 | 2013 | Augusta Savage, American sculptor | WGPSN |
| Sayat-Nova | 27.98°S 122.7°W | 146 | 1979 | Sayat-Nova, Armenian poet | WGPSN |
| Scarlatti | 40.7°N 101.16°W | 132 | 1979 | Domenico Scarlatti, Alessandro Scarlatti, Italian composers | WGPSN |
| Schoenberg | 16.06°S 136.08°W | 28 | 1976 | Arnold Schoenberg, Austrian composer | WGPSN |
| Schubert | 43.21°S 54.26°W | 190 | 1976 | Franz Schubert, Austrian composer | WGPSN |
| Scopas | 81.26°S 174.71°E | 83.16 | 1976 | Scopas, Ancient Greek sculptor and architect | WGPSN |
| Sei | 64.61°S 88.59°W | 137 | 1976 | Sei Shōnagon, Japanese writer | WGPSN |
| Seuss | 7.65°N 33.16°E | 64 | 2012 | Theodor Seuss Geisel, American author and cartoonist | WGPSN |
| Shakespeare | 48.1°N 152.25°W | 399 | 1979 | William Shakespeare, English writer | WGPSN |
| Shelley | 47.69°S 128.27°W | 171 | 1979 | Percy Bysshe Shelley, English poet | WGPSN |
| Sher-Gil | 45.26°S 134.74°E | 77 | 2008 | Amrita Sher-Gil, Indian painter | WGPSN |
| Shevchenko | 53.64°S 46.02°W | 143 | 1976 | Taras Shevchenko, Ukrainian poet | WGPSN |
| Sholem Aleichem | 50.92°N 90.48°W | 196 | 1979 | Sholom Aleichem, Yiddish writer | WGPSN |
| Sibelius | 49.5°S 145.37°W | 94 | 1985 | Jean Sibelius, Finnish composer | WGPSN |
| Simonides | 29.13°S 44.85°W | 87 | 1985 | Simonides of Ceos, Greek poet | WGPSN |
| Sinan | 15.46°N 30.59°W | 134 | 1976 | Mimar Sinan, Turkish architect | WGPSN |
| Smetana | 48.25°S 70.17°W | 191 | 1985 | Bedřich Smetana, Czech composer | WGPSN |
| Snorri | 9.17°S 83.24°W | 21 | 1976 | Snorri Sturluson, Icelandic poet | WGPSN |
| Sophocles | 6.95°S 146.04°W | 142 | 1976 | Sophocles, Ancient Greek dramatist | WGPSN |
| Sor Juana | 50.51°N 25.59°W | 102 | 1979 | Sor Juana Inés de la Cruz, Mexican writer | WGPSN |
| Sōseki | 39.31°N 38.77°W | 92 | 1985 | Natsume Sōseki, Japanese novelist | WGPSN |
| Sōtatsu | 48.73°S 18.17°W | 157 | 1976 | Tawaraya Sōtatsu, Japanese artist | WGPSN |
| Sousa | 46.69°N 0.63°E | 138 | 2012 | John Philip Sousa, American bandmaster and composer | WGPSN |
| Spitteler | 69.18°S 60.26°W | 67 | 1976 | Carl Spitteler, Swiss poet | WGPSN |
| Steichen | 12.79°S 77.04°E | 196 | 2010 | Edward Steichen, American photographer | WGPSN |
| Stevenson | 2.05°N 143.88°W | 134 | 2012 | Robert Louis Stevenson, Scottish author | WGPSN |
| Stieglitz | 72.54°N 67.63°E | 100 | 2012 | Alfred Stieglitz, American photographer | WGPSN |
| Strauss | 70.42°N 285.53°E | 17 | 2019 | Strauss family of musicians | WGPSN |
| Stravinsky | 51.95°N 78.9°W | 129 | 1979 | Igor Stravinsky, Russian composer | WGPSN |
| Strindberg | 53.41°N 136.67°W | 189 | 1979 | August Strindberg, Swedish writer | WGPSN |
| Sullivan | 16.19°S 86.88°W | 153.23 | 1976 | Louis Sullivan, American architect | WGPSN |
| Sūr Dās | 46.98°S 93.57°W | 131 | 1979 | Sur, Hindu, poet | WGPSN |
| Surikov | 36.98°S 124.9°W | 224 | 1979 | Vasily Surikov, Russian artist | WGPSN |
| Sveinsdóttir | 2.83°S 100.32°E | 212.79 | 2008 | Júlíana Sveinsdóttir, Icelandic artist | WGPSN |

back to top

== T ==
| Crater | Coordinates | Diameter (km) | Approval Year | Eponym | Ref |
|---|---|---|---|---|---|
| Takanobu | 30.66°N 108.56°W | 72 | 1985 | Fujiwara no Takanobu, Japanese poet | WGPSN |
| Takayoshi | 37.23°S 163.82°W | 136 | 1979 | Fujiwara no Takayoshi, Japanese painter | WGPSN |
| Tansen | 4.11°N 71.67°W | 27 | 1976 | Tansen, Hindustani composer | WGPSN |
| Thākur | 3.05°S 64.57°W | 111 | 1976 | Rabindranath Tagore, Indian writer | WGPSN |
| Theophanes | 5.02°S 142.78°W | 46 | 1976 | Theophanes the Greek, icon painter | WGPSN |
| Thoreau | 5.94°N 132.64°W | 72 | 1985 | Henry David Thoreau, American poet | WGPSN |
| Tintoretto | 47.99°S 22.95°W | 94 | 1976 | Tintoretto, Italian artist | WGPSN |
| Titian | 3.69°S 42.53°W | 109 | 1976 | Titian, Italian artist | WGPSN |
| To Ngoc Van | 52.49°N 111.7°W | 71 | 2009 | To Ngoc Van, Vietnamese painter | WGPSN |
| Tolkien | 88.82°N 148.92°E | 50 | 2012 | J. R. R. Tolkien, English writer | WGPSN |
| Tolstoj | 16.23°S 164.64°W | 355 | 1976 | Leo Tolstoy, Russian writer | WGPSN |
| Travers | 28.0°S 329.1°W | 164 | 2018 | Pamela Lyndon Travers, British writer | WGPSN |
| Tsʻai Wen-Chi | 23.47°N 23.15°W | 124 | 1976 | Cai Wenji, Chinese poet and composer | WGPSN |
| Tsʻao Chan | 13.31°S 142.35°W | 110 | 1976 | Cao Xueqin, Chinese novelist | WGPSN |
| Tsurayuki | 62.99°S 20.34°W | 83 | 1976 | Ki no Tsurayuki, Japanese writer | WGPSN |
| Tung Yüan | 75.02°N 62.83°W | 60.46 | 1979 | Dong Yuan, Chinese artist | WGPSN |
| Turgenev | 65.68°N 136.26°W | 136 | 1979 | Ivan Turgenev, Russian writer | WGPSN |
| Tyagaraja | 3.89°N 148.9°W | 97 | 1976 | Tyāgarāja, Indian composer | WGPSN |
| Tryggvadóttir | 89.55°N 171.56°W | 31 | 2012 | Nína Tryggvadóttir, Icelandic artist | WGPSN |

back to top

== U ==
| Crater | Coordinates | Diameter (km) | Approval Year | Eponym | Ref |
|---|---|---|---|---|---|
| Unkei | 31.79°S 62.6°W | 121 | 1976 | Unkei, Japanese sculptor | WGPSN |
| Ustad Isa | 31.91°S 166.11°W | 138 | 1979 | Ustad Isa, architect | WGPSN |

back to top

== V ==
| Crater | Coordinates | Diameter (km) | Approval Year | Eponym | Ref |
|---|---|---|---|---|---|
| Vālmiki | 23.58°S 141.41°W | 210 | 1976 | Valmiki, Indian poet | WGPSN |
| Van Dijck | 75.8°N 166.63°W | 101.53 | 1979 | Anthony van Dyck, Flemish artist | WGPSN |
| Van Eyck | 43.22°N 159.43°W | 271 | 1979 | Jan van Eyck, Flemish artist | WGPSN |
| Van Gogh | 76.88°S 138.68°W | 99 | 1976 | Vincent van Gogh, Dutch artist | WGPSN |
| Varma | 80.04°N 18.97°W | 30 | 2013 | Raja Ravi Varma, Indian painter | WGPSN |
| Vazov | 65.4°S 212.33°W | 33 | 2020 | Ivan Vazov, Bulgarian poet | WGPSN |
| Velázquez | 37.59°N 55.43°W | 128 | 1979 | Diego Velázquez, Spanish painter | WGPSN |
| Verdi | 64.36°N 169.71°W | 145 | 1979 | Giuseppe Verdi, Italian composer | WGPSN |
| Veronese | 5.3°N 55.95°W | 45 | 2021 | Paolo Veronese, Italian painter | WGPSN |
| Vieira da Silva | 1.54°N 123.41°W | 274 | 2013 | Maria Helena Vieira da Silva, Portuguese-French painter | WGPSN |
| Villa-Lobos | 5.27°N 6.79°E | 67 | 2015 | Heitor Villa-Lobos, Brazilian composer | WGPSN |
| Vincente | 56.75°S 142.96°W | 108 | 1979 | Gil Vicente, Portuguese writer | WGPSN |
| Vivaldi | 13.76°N 85.92°W | 213 | 1976 | Antonio Vivaldi, Italian composer | WGPSN |
| Vlaminck | 28.48°N 13.51°W | 82 | 1985 | Maurice de Vlaminck, French painter | WGPSN |
| Vonnegut | 82.72°N 249.91°W | 26.61 | 2017 | Kurt Vonnegut, American writer | WGPSN |
| Vyāsa | 49.79°N 84.62°W | 297 | 1979 | Vyasa, Indian poet | WGPSN |

back to top

== W ==
| Crater | Coordinates | Diameter (km) | Approval Year | Eponym | Ref |
|---|---|---|---|---|---|
| Wagner | 68.25°S 114.78°W | 134 | 1976 | Richard Wagner, German composer | WGPSN |
| Wang Meng | 8.53°N 104.12°W | 165 | 1976 | Wang Meng, Chinese artist | WGPSN |
| Warhol | 2.55°S 6.27°W | 91 | 2012 | Andy Warhol, American artist | WGPSN |
| Waters | 8.96°S 105.45°W | 15 | 2012 | Muddy Waters, American musician | WGPSN |
| Wen Tianxiang | 45.34°S 191.6°W | 166.42 | 2020 | Wen Tianxiang, Chinese poet | WGPSN |
| Wergeland | 37.93°S 56.36°W | 42 | 1976 | Henrik Wergeland, Norwegian writer | WGPSN |
| Whitman | 41.4°N 111.64°W | 64 | 1985 | Walt Whitman, American poet | WGPSN |
| Wren | 24.84°N 35.95°W | 204 | 1979 | Christopher Wren, English architect | WGPSN |
| Wu Shujuan | 70.8°S 346.73°W | 109 | 2024 | Wu Shujuan, Chinese painter | WGPSN |

back to top

== X ==
| Crater | Coordinates | Diameter (km) | Approval Year | Eponym | Ref |
|---|---|---|---|---|---|
| Xiao Zhao | 10.58°N 123.84°E | 24 | 2008 | Xiao Zhao, Chinese artist | WGPSN |

back to top

== Y ==
| Crater | Coordinates | Diameter (km) | Approval Year | Eponym | Ref |
|---|---|---|---|---|---|
| Yamada | 82.54°N 136.16°E | 17.1 | 2015 | Kosaku Yamada, Japanese composer and conductor | WGPSN |
| Yeats | 9.44°N 35.03°W | 92 | 1976 | William Butler Yeats, Irish poet | WGPSN |
| Yoshikawa | 81.21°N 106.03°E | 30 | 2012 | Eiji Yoshikawa, Japanese novelist | WGPSN |
| Yun Sŏn-Do | 73.49°S 110.08°W | 76 | 1976 | Yun Sŏndo, Korean poet | WGPSN |

back to top

== Z ==
| Crater | Coordinates | Diameter (km) | Approval Year | Eponym | Ref |
|---|---|---|---|---|---|
| Zeami | 2.96°S 147.41°W | 129 | 1976 | Zeami Motokiyo, Japanese playwright | WGPSN |
| Zola | 49.75°N 178.25°W | 70 | 1979 | Émile Zola, French novelist | WGPSN |

back to top

== Terminology ==
As on the Moon and Mars, sequences of craters and basins of differing relative ages provide the best means of establishing stratigraphic order on Mercury. Overlap relations among many large mercurian craters and basins are clearer than those on the Moon. Therefore, as this map shows, we can build up many local stratigraphic columns involving both crater or basin materials and nearby plains materials.

Over all of Mercury, the crispness of crater rims and the morphology of their walls, central peaks, ejecta deposits, and secondary-crater fields have undergone systematic changes with time. The youngest craters or basins in a local stratigraphic sequence have the sharpest, crispest appearance. The oldest craters consist only of shallow depressions with slightly raised, rounded rims, some incomplete. On this basis, five age categories of craters and basins have been mapped; the characteristics of each are listed in the explanation. In addition, secondary crater fields are preserved around proportionally far more craters and basins on Mercury than on the Moon or Mars, and are particularly useful in determining overlap relations and degree of modification.

Because only limited photographic evidence was available from Mariner 10's three flybys of the planet, these divisions are often tentative. The five crater groups, from youngest to oldest, are:

- c5: Fresh-appearing, sharp-rimmed, rayed craters. Highest albedo in map area; haloes and rays may extend many crater diameters from rim crests. Superposed on all other map units. Generally smaller and fewer than older craters.
- c4: Fresh but slightly modified craters—Similar in morphology to c5 craters but without bright haloes or rays; sharp rim crests; continuous ejecta blankets; very few superposed secondary craters. Floors consist of crater or smooth plains materials.
- c3: Modified craters—Rim crest continuous but slightly rounded and subdued. Ejecta blanket generally less extensive than those of younger craters of similar size. Superposed craters and rays common; smooth plains and intermediate plains materials cover floors of many craters. Central peaks more common than in c4 craters, probably because of larger average size of c3 craters.
- c2: Subdued craters—Low-rimmed, relatively shallow craters, many with discontinuous rim crests. Floors covered by smooth plains and intermediate plains materials. Crater density of ejecta blankets similar to that of intermediate plains material.
- c1 Degraded craters—Similar to c2 crater material but more deteriorated; many superposed craters.

== See also ==
- List of geological features on Mercury
- List of quadrangles on Mercury
