= Scopas (crater) =

Crater on Mercury

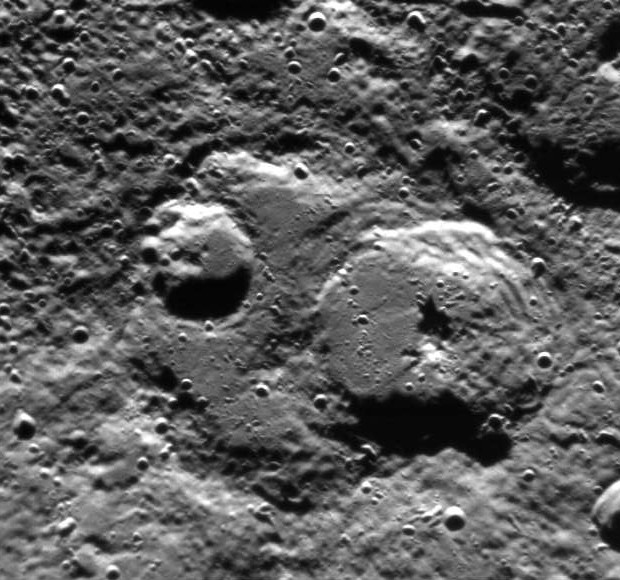
- MESSENGER image, with north at the bottom
- Planet: Mercury
- Coordinates: 81.26°S 185.29°W
- Quadrangle: Bach
- Diameter: 83.16 km (51.67 mi)
- Eponym: Scopas

Scopas is a crater on Mercury, near the south pole. Its name was adopted by the International Astronomical Union in 1976, after the ancient Greek sculptor and architect Scopas, following the official convention of naming craters on Mercury after historically significant artists, musicians, painters, and authors.

Two smaller, unnamed craters overlie Scopas crater itself. The northern rims of these craters are in permanent shadow.

Ictinus crater is immediately to the northeast of Scopas.
