= Qiu Ying (crater) =

Crater on Mercury

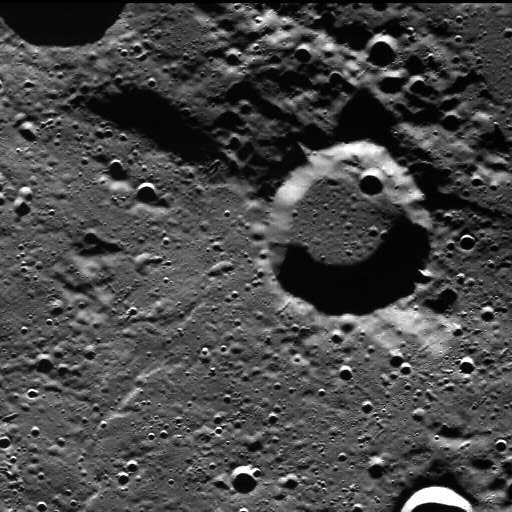
- MESSENGER image
- Planet: Mercury
- Coordinates: 82.67°N 85.7°W
- Quadrangle: Borealis
- Diameter: 20 km
- Eponym: Qiu Ying

Qiu Ying is a crater on Mercury. Its name was adopted by the International Astronomical Union in 2012, for the Chinese painter Qiu Ying.
