= Ghiberti (crater) =

Crater on Mercury

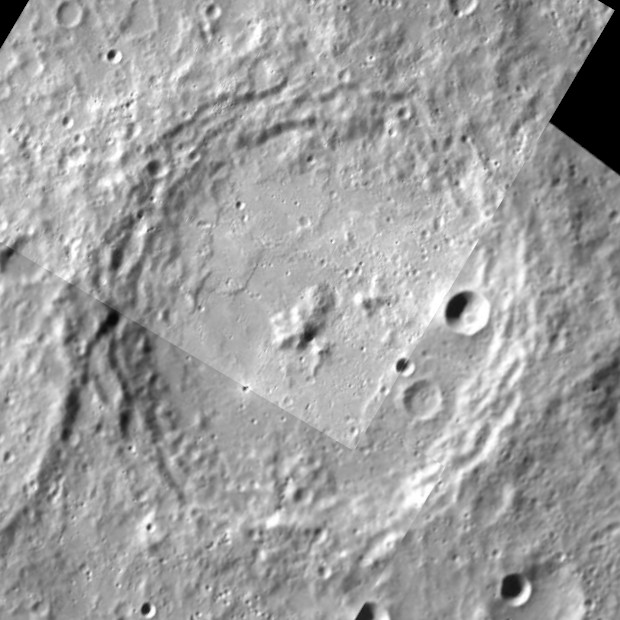
- MESSENGER NAC mosaic
- Feature type: Central-peak impact crater
- Location: Discovery quadrangle, Mercury
- Coordinates: 48.55°S 80.15°W
- Diameter: 110 km (68 mi)
- Eponym: Lorenzo Ghiberti

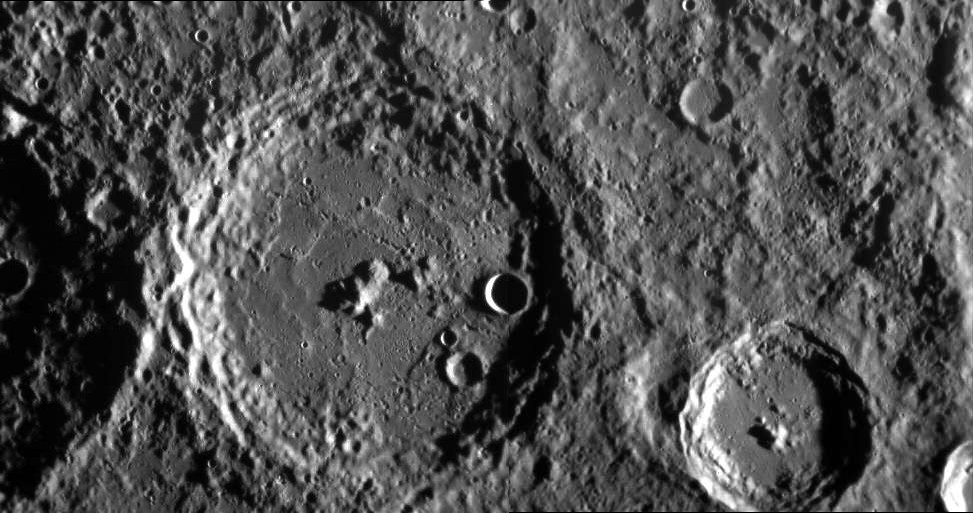
Another MESSENGER NAC mosaic

Ghiberti is a crater on Mercury, with a diameter of 110 kilometers. Its name, Ghiberti, was adopted by the International Astronomical Union (IAU) in 1976; after the Italian sculptor Lorenzo Ghiberti (1378-1455).

To the east of Ghiberti is the crater Smetana, and to the west is Sūr Dās.
