= Sarmiento (crater) =

Crater on Mercury

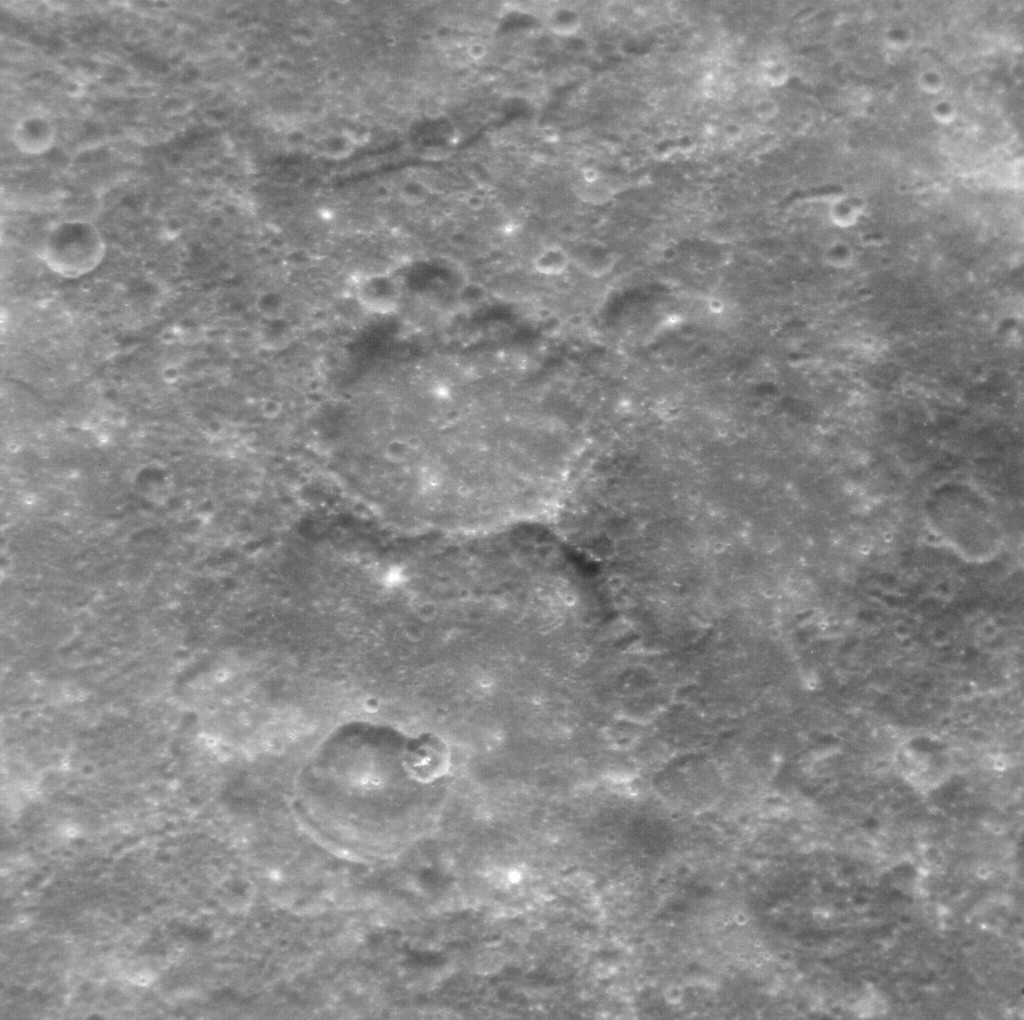
- MESSENGER NAC image at high sun angle
- Planet: Mercury
- Coordinates: 29.27°S 189.58°W
- Quadrangle: Neruda
- Diameter: 95 km (152 mi)
- Eponym: Domingo Faustino Sarmiento

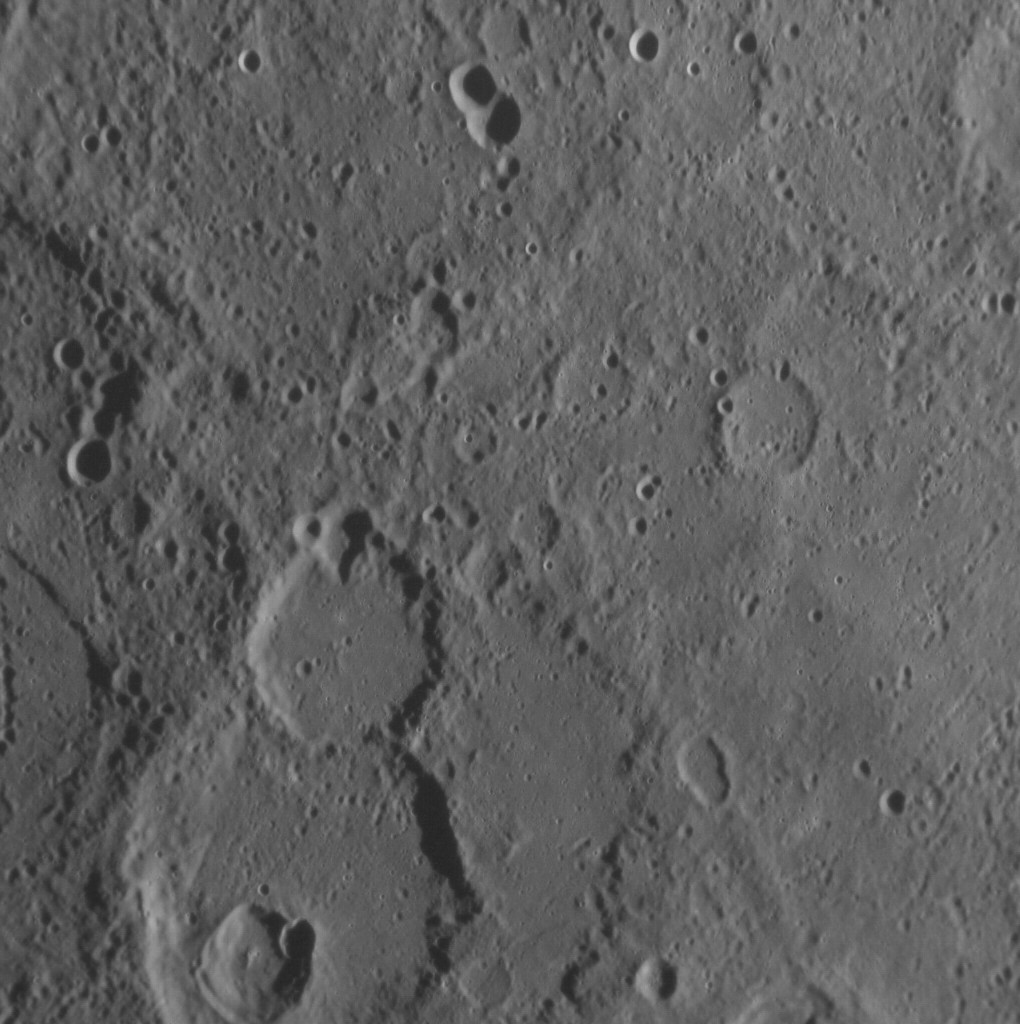
Sarmiento is below left of center in this MESSENGER NAC image

Sarmiento is a crater on Mercury. Its name was adopted by the International Astronomical Union (IAU) in 1979, and is named for the Argentine writer Domingo Faustino Sarmiento.
