= Po Chü-I (crater) =

Crater on Mercury

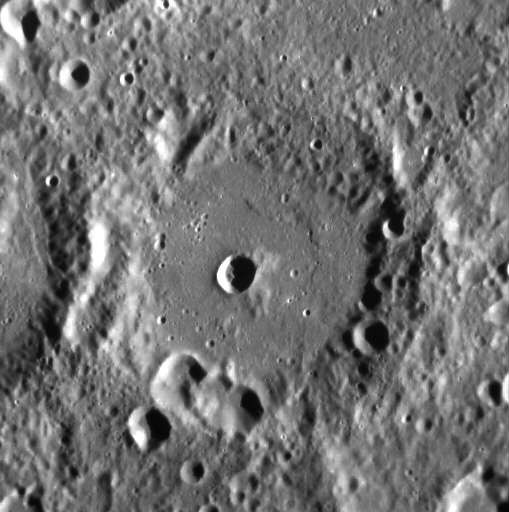
- MESSENGER NAC
- Planet: Mercury
- Coordinates: 6.94°S 165.28°W
- Quadrangle: Tolstoj
- Diameter: 70.0 km (43.5 mi)
- Eponym: Bai Juyi

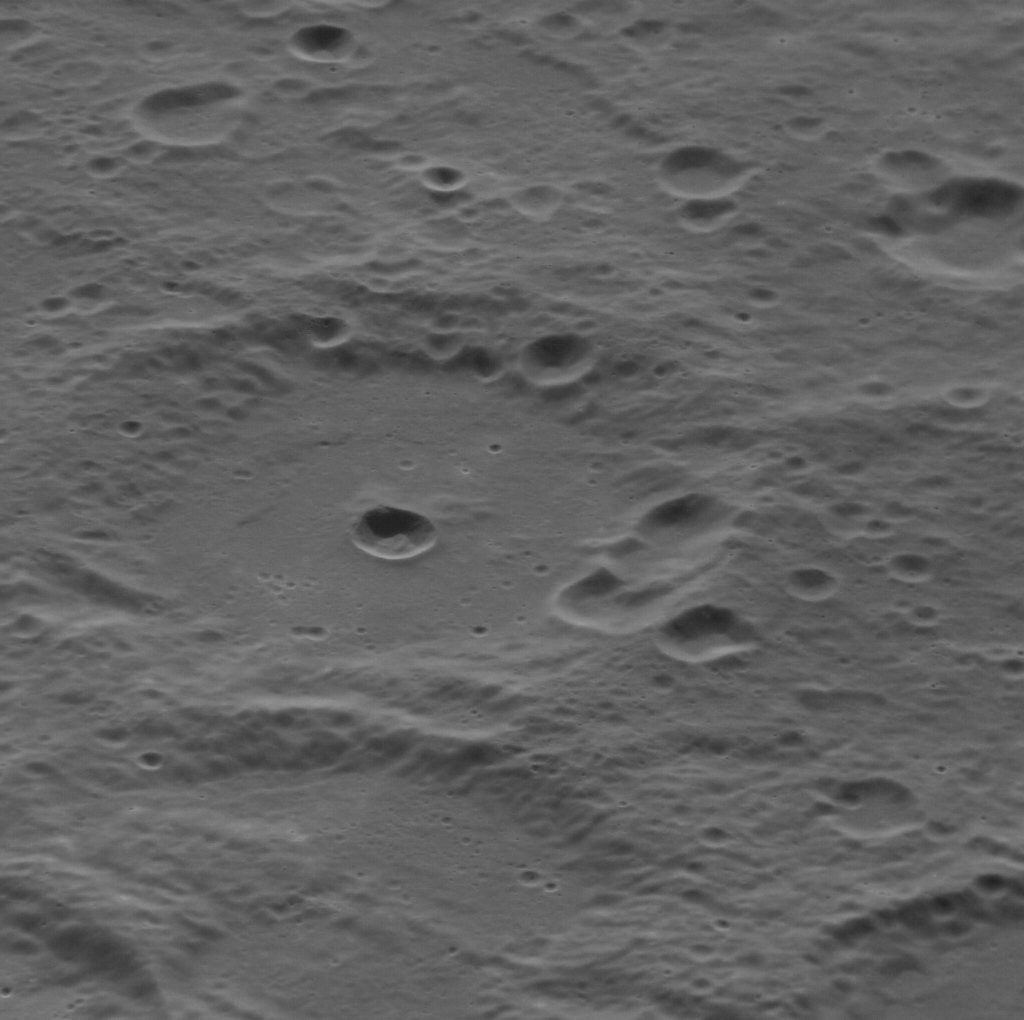
Oblique view

Po Chü-I is a crater on Mercury. Its name was adopted by the International Astronomical Union (IAU) in 1976. Po Chü-I is named for the Chinese poet Bai Juyi.
