= Tung Yüan (crater) =

Crater on Mercury

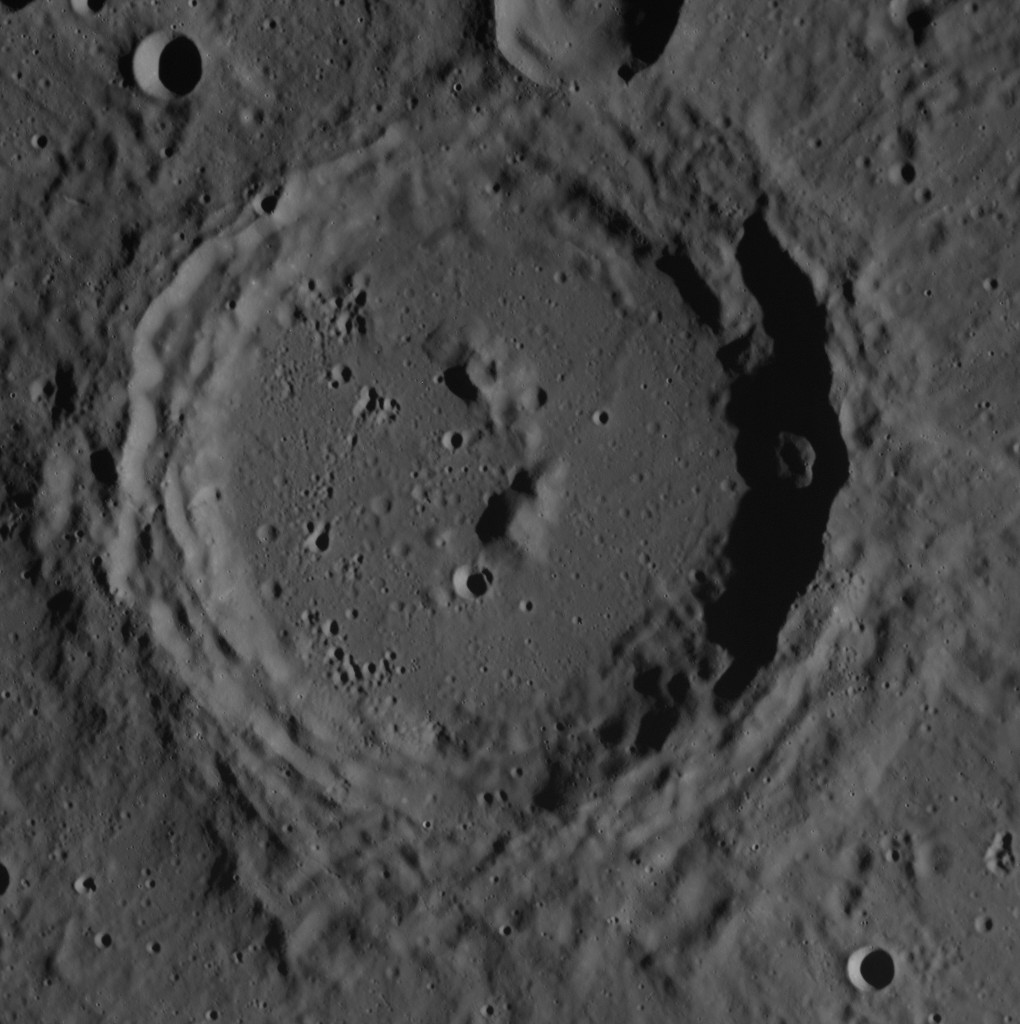
- MESSENGER image
- Planet: Mercury
- Coordinates: 75.02°N 62.83°W
- Quadrangle: Borealis
- Diameter: 60.46 km
- Eponym: Tung Yüan

Tung Yüan is a crater on Mercury, within the Borealis Planitia. Its name was adopted by the International Astronomical Union in 1979, for the 10th century Chinese painter Tung Yüan.

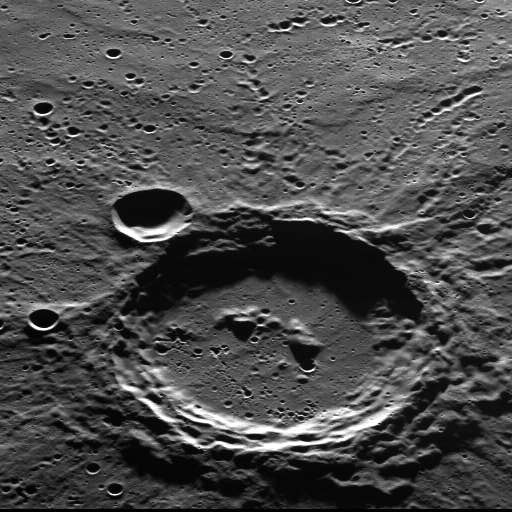
Oblique view
