= Yun Sŏn-Do (crater) =

Crater on Mercury

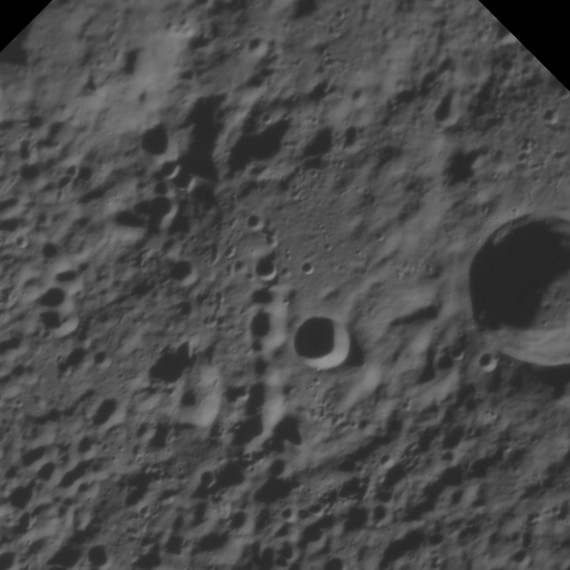
- MESSENGER NAC image
- Planet: Mercury
- Coordinates: 73.49°S 110.08°W
- Quadrangle: Bach
- Diameter: 76 km (47 mi)
- Eponym: Yun Sŏndo

Yun Sŏn-Do is a crater on Mercury. It has a diameter of 76 kilometres (47 mi). Its name was adopted by the International Astronomical Union (IAU) in 1976. Yun Sŏn-Do is named for the Korean poet Yun Sŏndo.
