= Kandinsky (crater) =

Crater on Mercury

- Planet: Mercury
- Coordinates: 87.89°N 281.22°E
- Quadrangle: Borealis
- Diameter: 60.0 km (37.3 mi)
- Eponym: Wassily Kandinsky

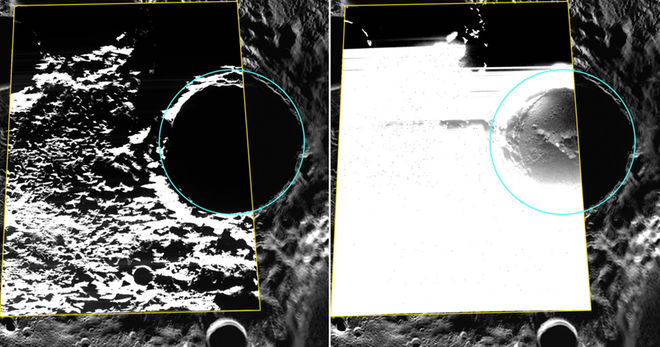
The crater, showing possible water ice

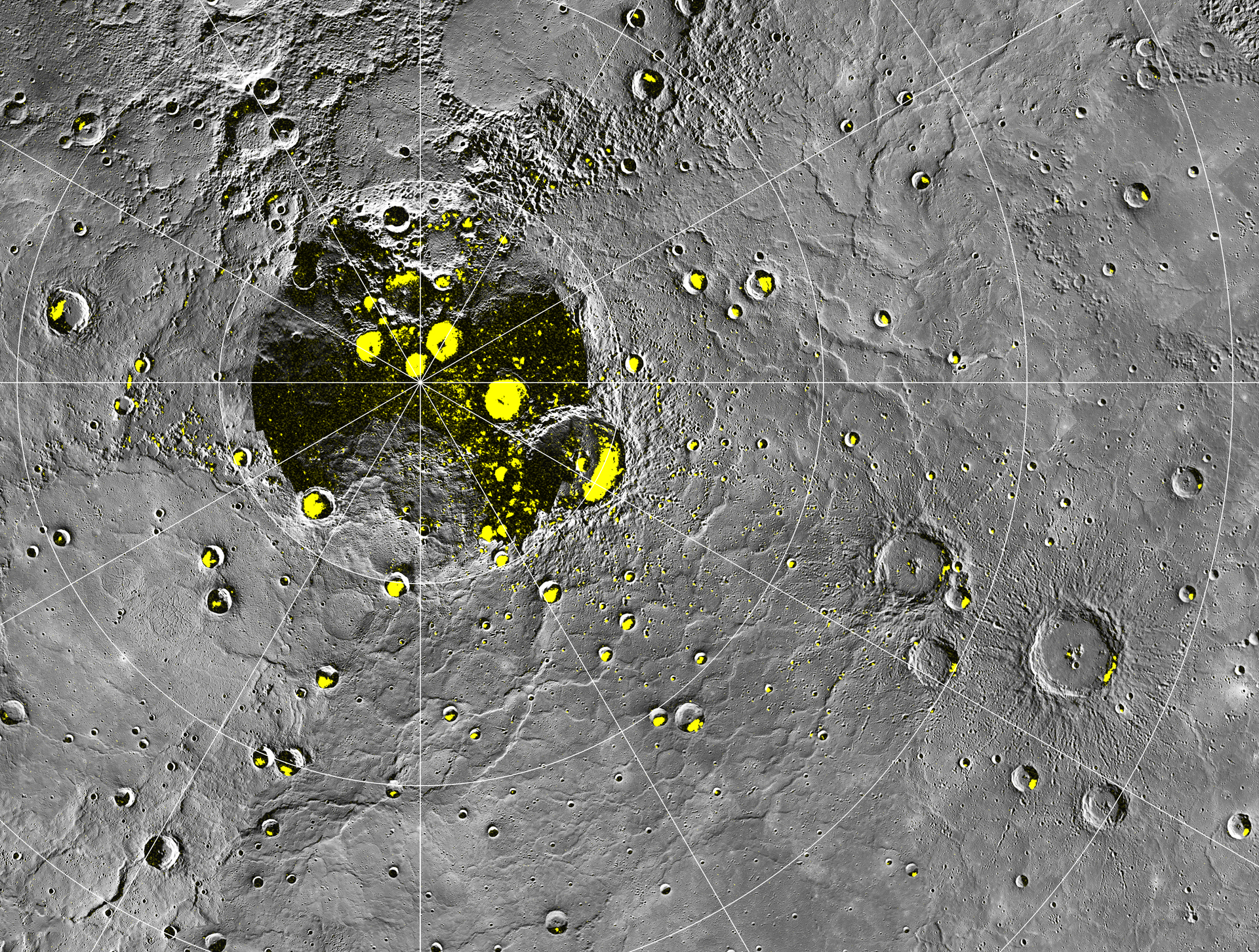
Radar-bright deposits near the north pole. Kandinsky is near the center.

Kandinsky is a deep crater on Mercury, located near the planet's north pole. It was named by the IAU in 2012 for Russian painter Wassily Kandinsky.

Much of the floor of Kandinsky is a region of permanent shadow, which has a bright radar signature. This is interpreted to represent a deposit of water ice.

The possible water ice was directly imaged by MESSENGER.
