= Grotell (crater) =

Crater on Mercury

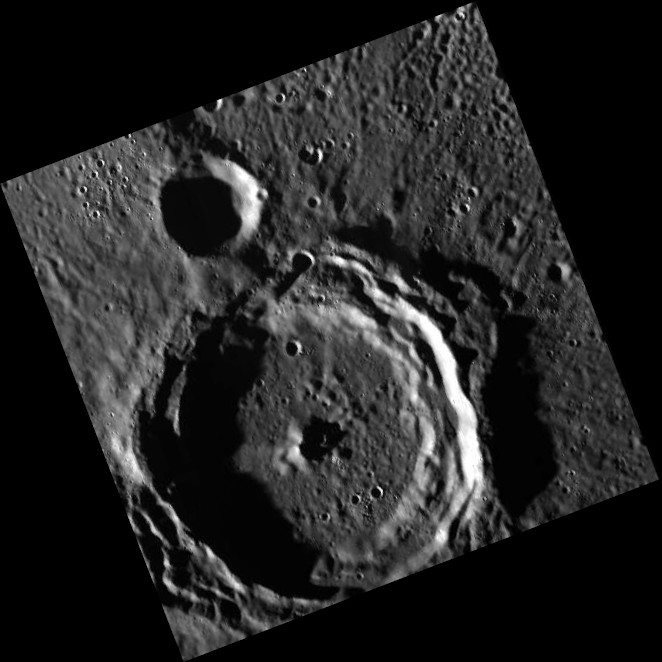
- MESSENGER WAC
- Planet: Mercury
- Coordinates: 71.09°N 31.63°W
- Quadrangle: Borealis
- Diameter: 48.25 km (29.98 mi)
- Eponym: Maija Grotell

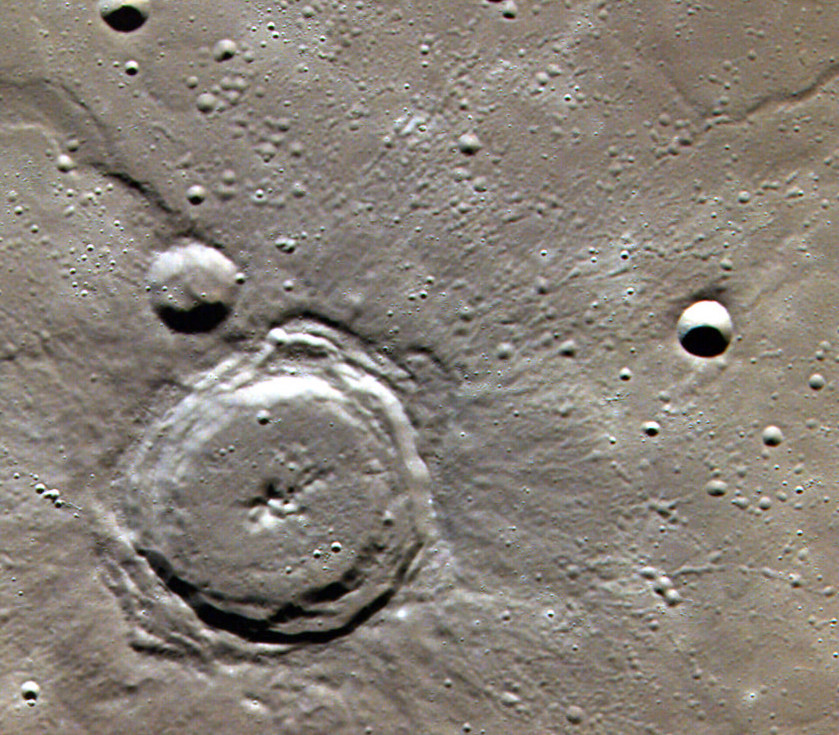
Exaggerated color image

Grotell is a crater on Mercury. It has a diameter of 48.25 kilometres (29.98 miles). Its name was adopted by the International Astronomical Union (IAU) on April 24, 2012. Grotell is named for the Finnish-American ceramist Maija Grotell.
