= Magritte (crater) =

Crater on Mercury

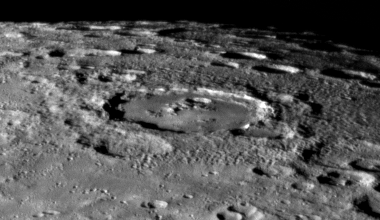
- MESSENGER image, from first flyby in January 2008
- Planet: Mercury
- Coordinates: 72.78°S 238.37°W
- Quadrangle: Bach
- Diameter: 149 km (93 mi)
- Eponym: René Magritte

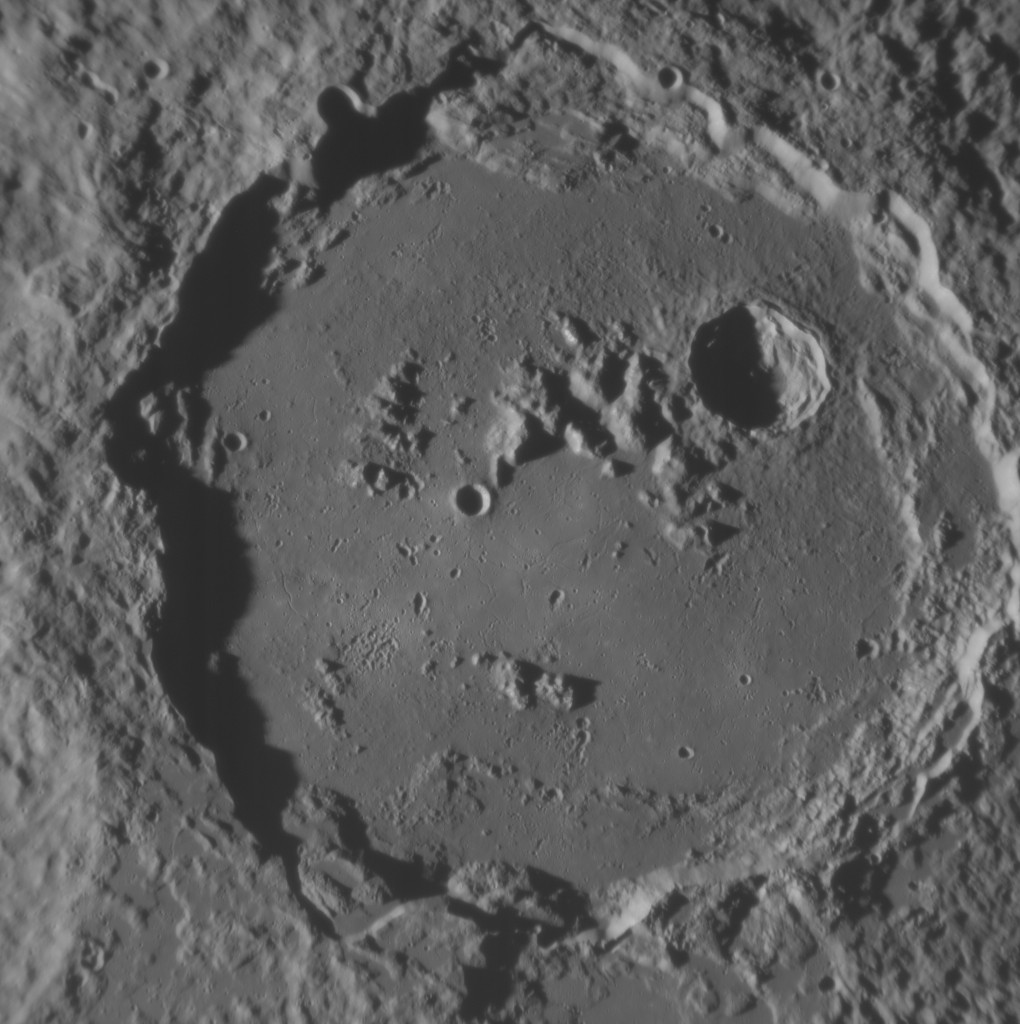
Magritte crater from MESSENGER

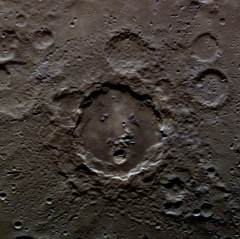
A color view from MESSENGER

Magritte is a crater on Mercury, near the south pole. This crater was likely created by an impact event, as evident by its circular depression. Its name was adopted by the International Astronomical Union in 2012, after the Belgian painter, René Magritte. Magritte is one of several craters on Mercury named after famous artists. Per the Working Group for Planetary System Nomenclature, all Mercury craters are named after an artist who was famous for more than fifty years who has been deceased for more than three years at the time the crater is named.

Magritte is one of 110 peak ring basins on Mercury.

It is located in close proximity to Disney, a crater famous for its resemblance to Mickey Mouse.
