= Kunisada (crater) =

Crater on Mercury

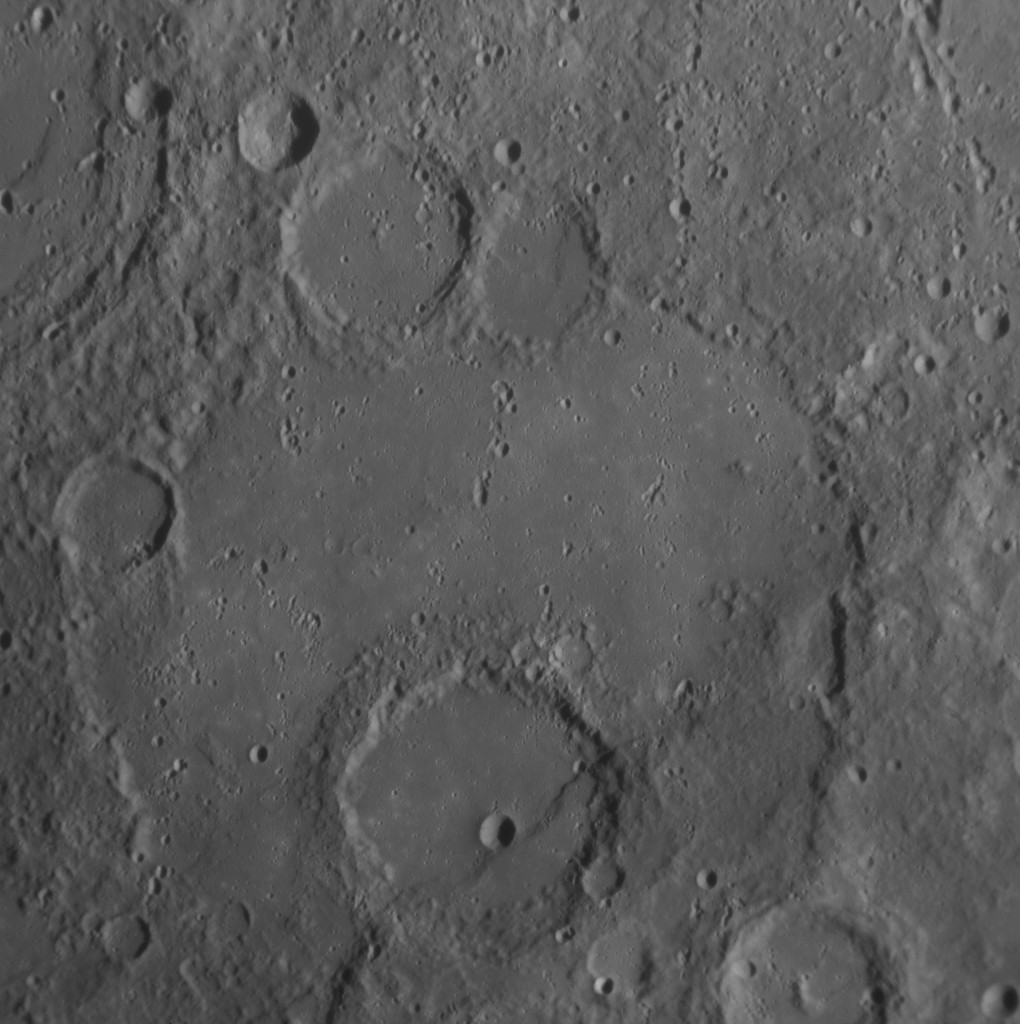
- MESSENGER image, acquired on its first flyby on 14 January 2008
- Feature type: Impact crater
- Location: Eminescu quadrangle, Mercury
- Coordinates: 1.36°N 247.14°W
- Diameter: 241 km (150 mi)
- Eponym: Utagawa Kunisada

Kunisada is a crater on Mercury. It has a diameter of 241 km (150 mi). Its name was adopted by the International Astronomical Union in 2009. Kunisada is named for the Japanese woodblock printer Utagawa Kunisada, who lived from 1786 to 1864.

The smooth plains material filling Kunisada crater are believed to be volcanic, similar to the maria on the moon.
