= Melville (crater) =

Crater on Mercury

- Feature type: Impact crater
- Location: Victoria quadrangle, Mercury
- Coordinates: 21.5°N 10.1°W
- Diameter: 154 km
- Eponym: Herman Melville

Melville is a crater on Mercury. It has a diameter of 154 kilometers. Its name was adopted by the International Astronomical Union (IAU) in 1976. Melville is named for the American novelist Herman Melville, who lived from 1819 to 1891.
