= Lorde (crater) =

Crater on Mercury

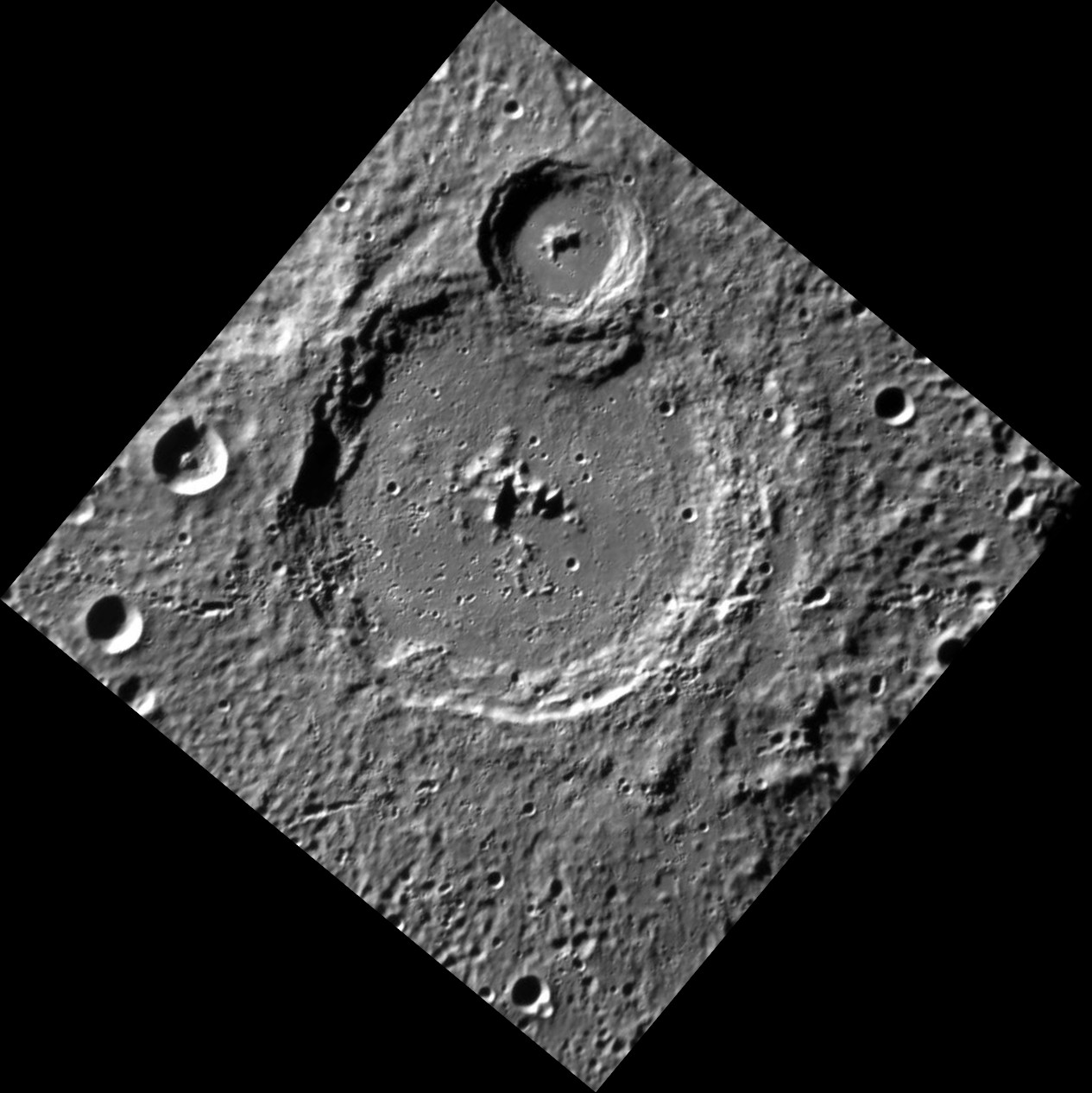
- MESSENGER NAC with Lorde at top (the larger crater is unnamed)
- Planet: Mercury
- Coordinates: 69.12°S 49.57°W
- Quadrangle: Bach
- Diameter: 45.0 km (28.0 mi)
- Eponym: Audre Lorde

Lorde is a crater on Mercury. Its name was adopted by the International Astronomical Union (IAU) in 2022. The crater is named for American poet Audre Lorde.
