= Raden Saleh (crater) =

Crater on Mercury

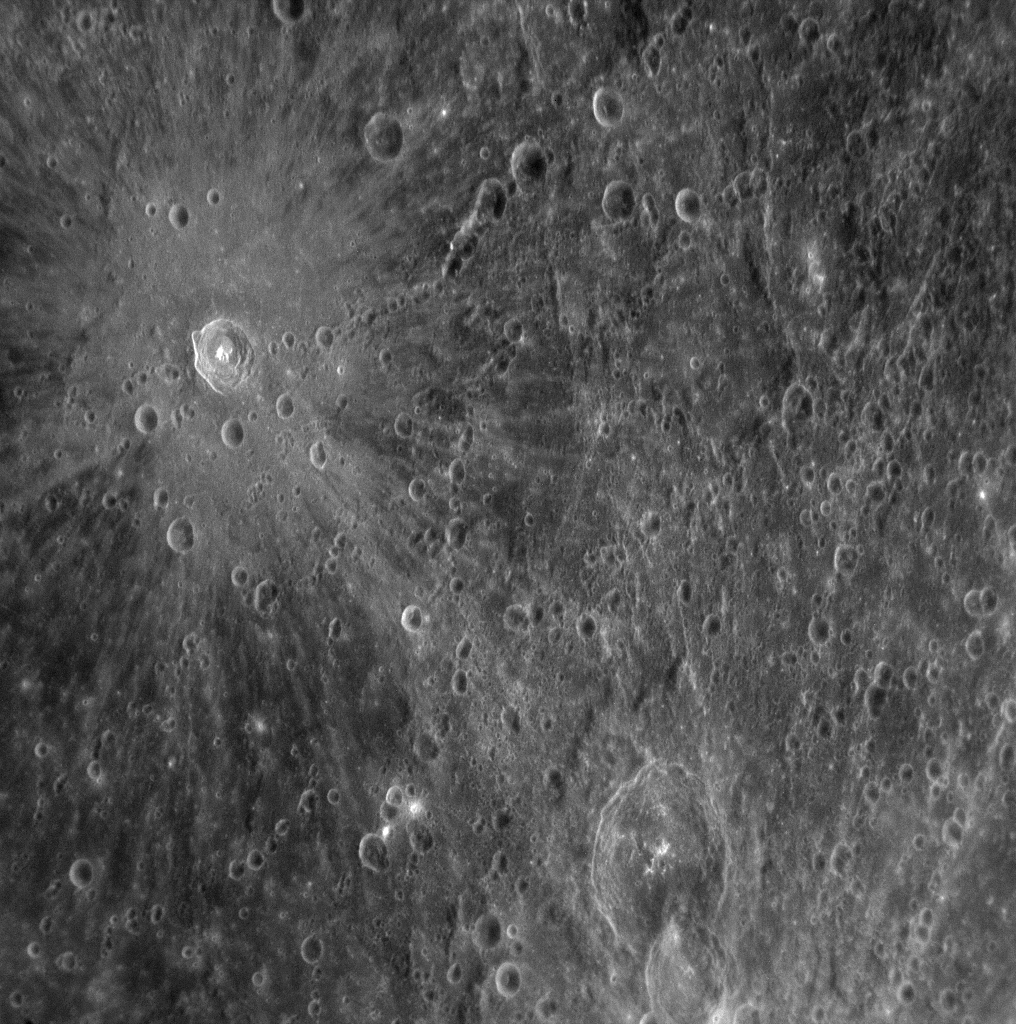
- MESSENGER image. Raden Saleh is the crater with bright rays in the upper left.
- Feature type: Impact crater
- Location: Tolstoj quadrangle, Mercury
- Coordinates: 2.07°N 201.17°W
- Diameter: 23 km
- Eponym: Raden Saleh

Raden Saleh is a crater on Mercury. Its name was approved by the IAU in 2008, and it is named after a famous Indonesian painter named Raden Saleh.

== Views ==
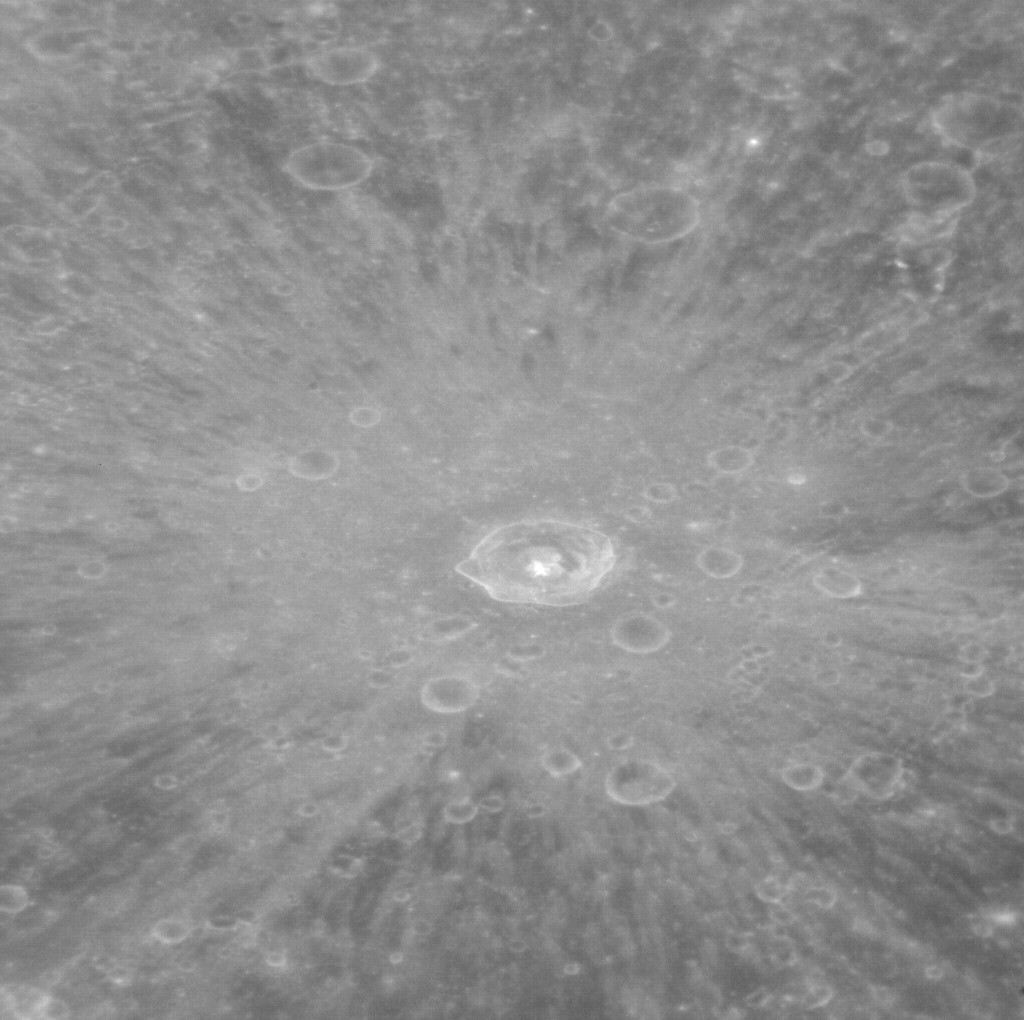
Oblique MESSENGER image showing the rays

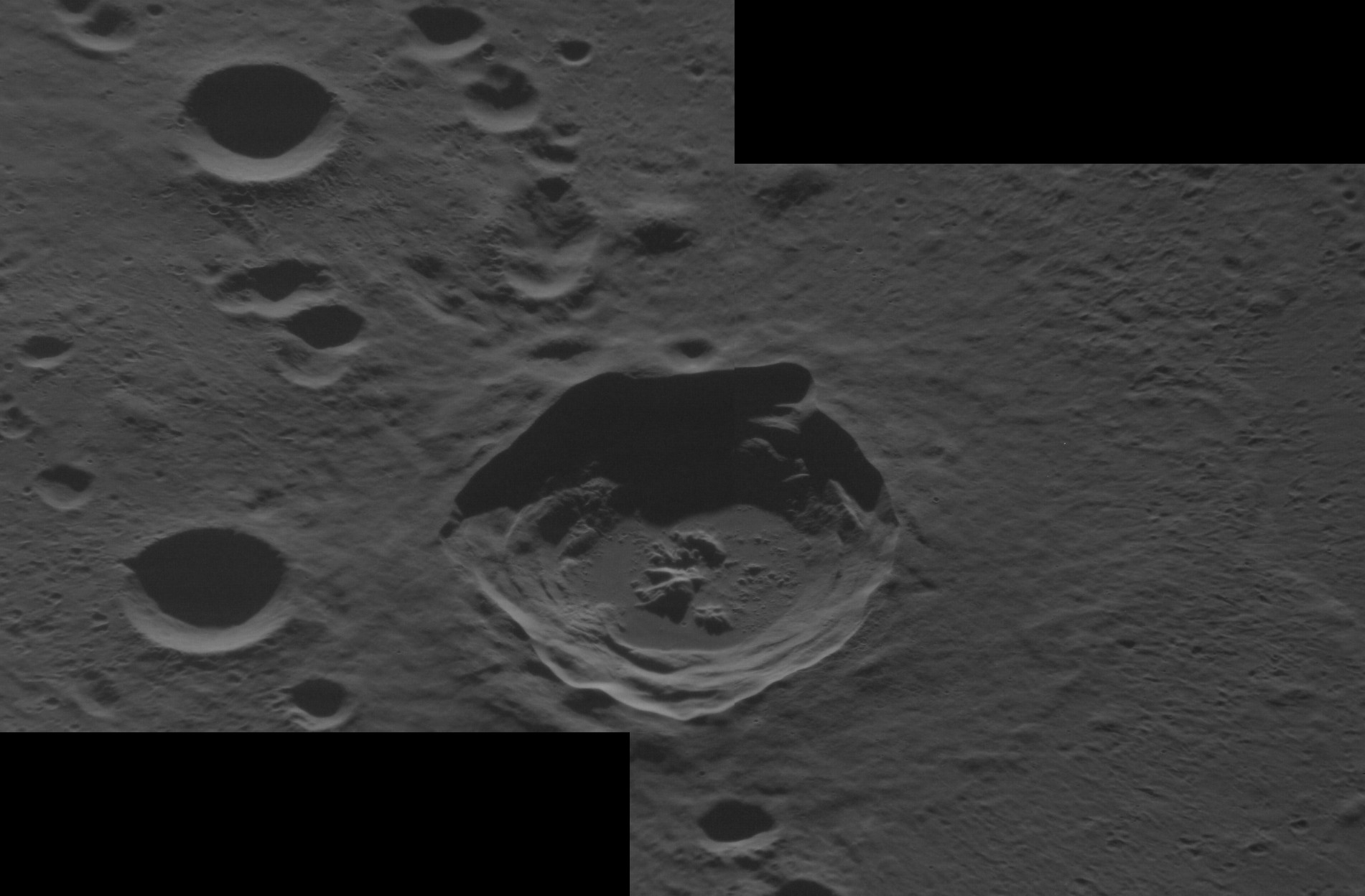
MESSENGER mosaic, at a low sun angle, showing detail of the crater interior
