= Belinskij (crater) =

Crater on Mercury

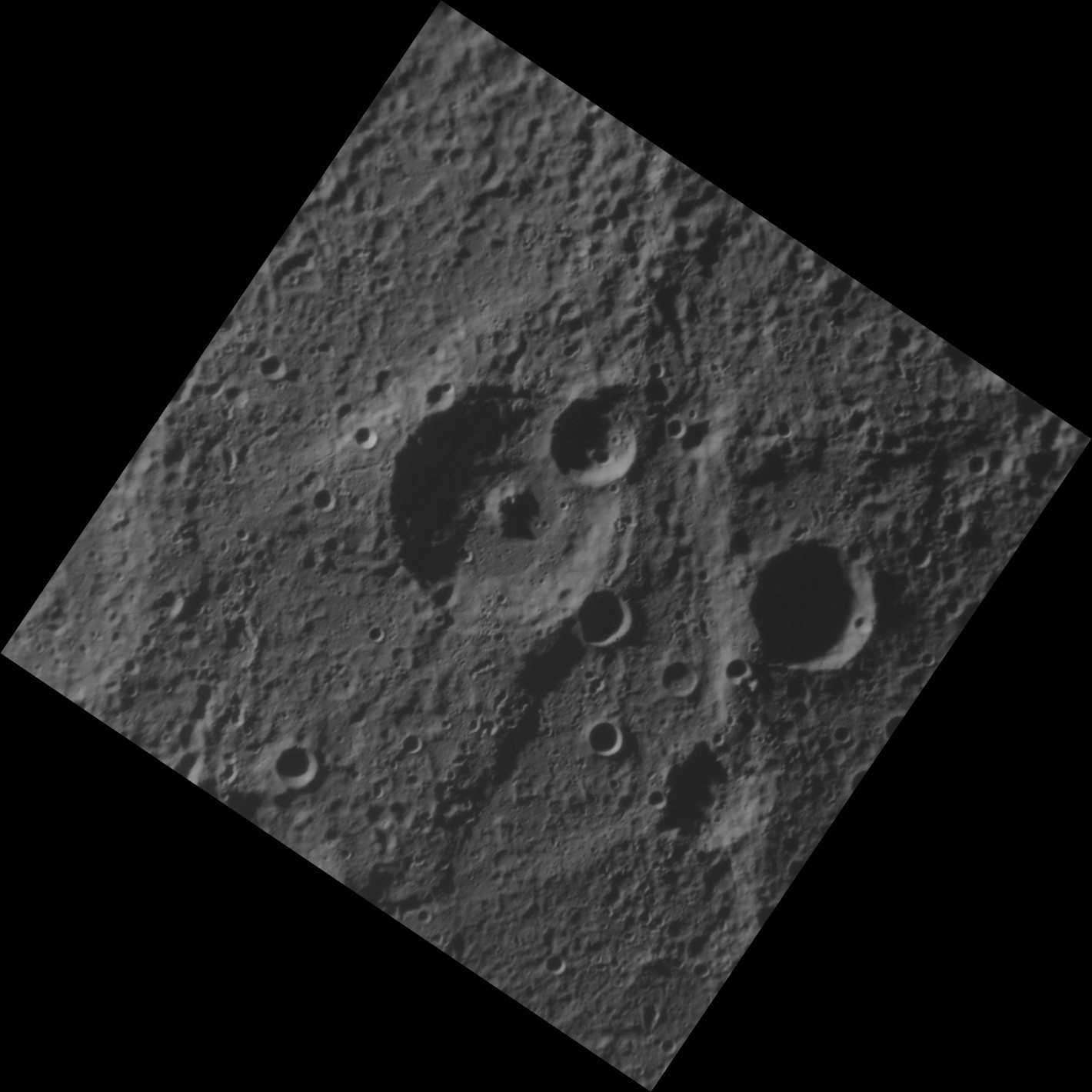
- MESSENGER NAC
- Feature type: Impact crater
- Location: Bach quadrangle, Mercury
- Coordinates: 76.0°S 103.4°W
- Diameter: 70 km
- Eponym: Vissarion Belinsky

Belinskij (sometimes Belinskii) is a crater on Mercury. It has a diameter of 70 kilometers. Its name was adopted by the International Astronomical Union in 1985. Belinskij is named for the Russian journalist and critic Vissarion Grigoryevich Belinsky, who lived from 1811 to 1848.
