= Berlioz (crater) =

Crater on Mercury

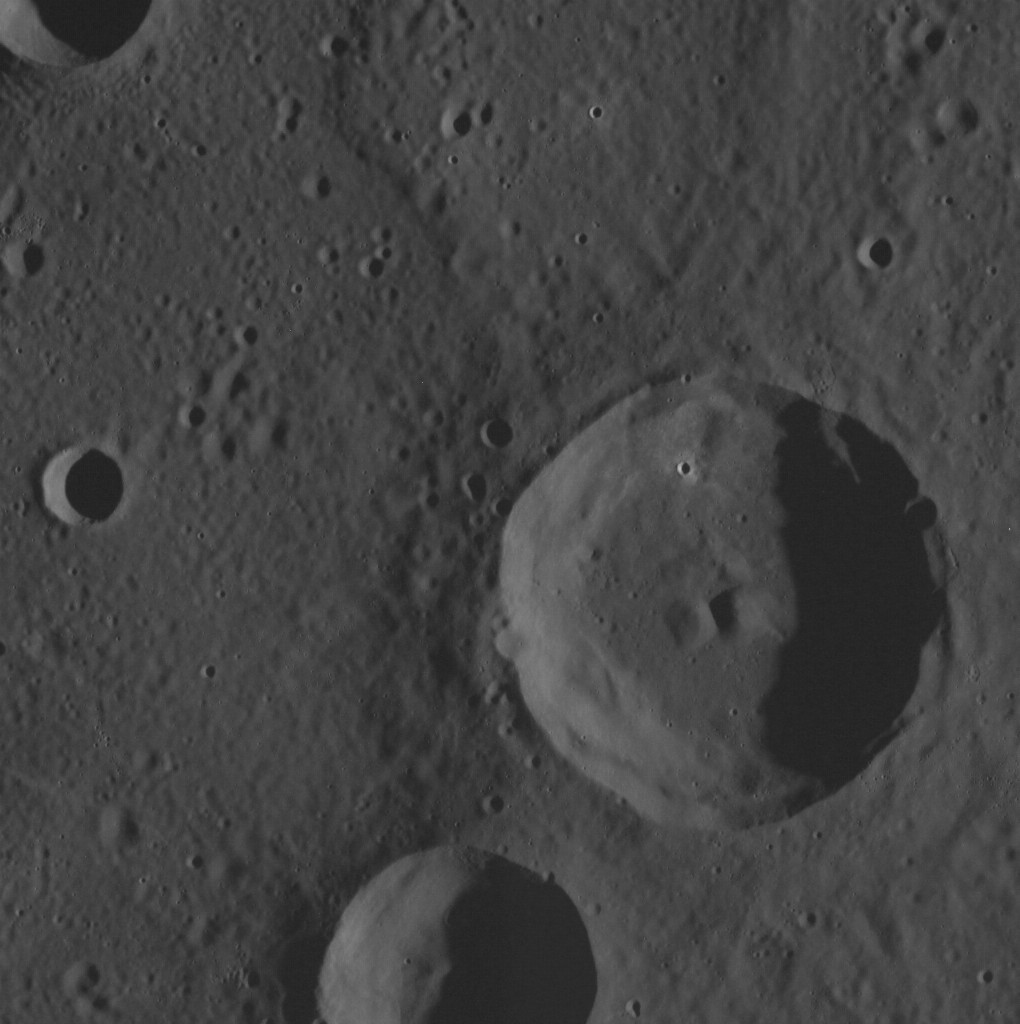
- MESSENGER WAC image of Berlioz, slightly right of center
- Feature type: Central-peak impact crater
- Location: Borealis quadrangle, Mercury
- Coordinates: 79.36°N 321.34°W
- Diameter: 31.44 km (19.54 mi)
- Eponym: Hector Berlioz

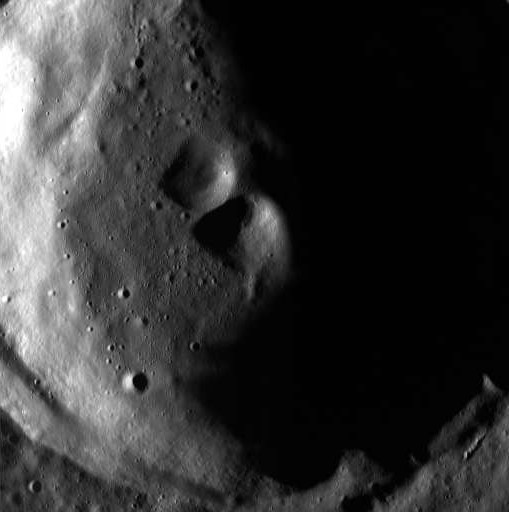
Berlioz crater interior

Berlioz is a crater on Mercury, located near the north pole. Its name was adopted by the International Astronomical Union (IAU) in 2013. It is named for the French composer Hector Berlioz.

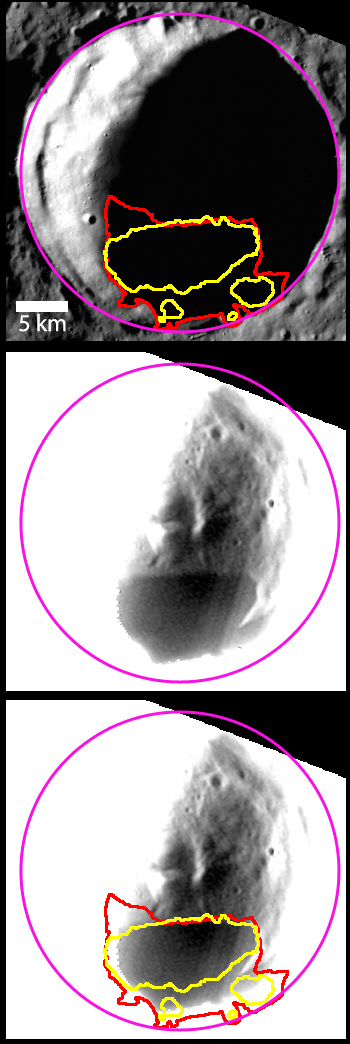
The top image shows a view of Berlioz crater, with the regions that host radar-bright material (yellow) and persistent shadows (red) identified. The middle image was acquired a few hours after the top image, using a longer exposure of the WAC broadband filter, and stretched to reveal the details within the shadowed crater. A distinctively darker region is seen on the crater's floor, which corresponds well with the radar-bright and shadowed regions (bottom image). The darker, low-reflectance material is postulated to be composed of frozen, organic-rich, volatile materials that form through a lag deposit process.
