= Du Fu (crater) =

Crater on Mercury

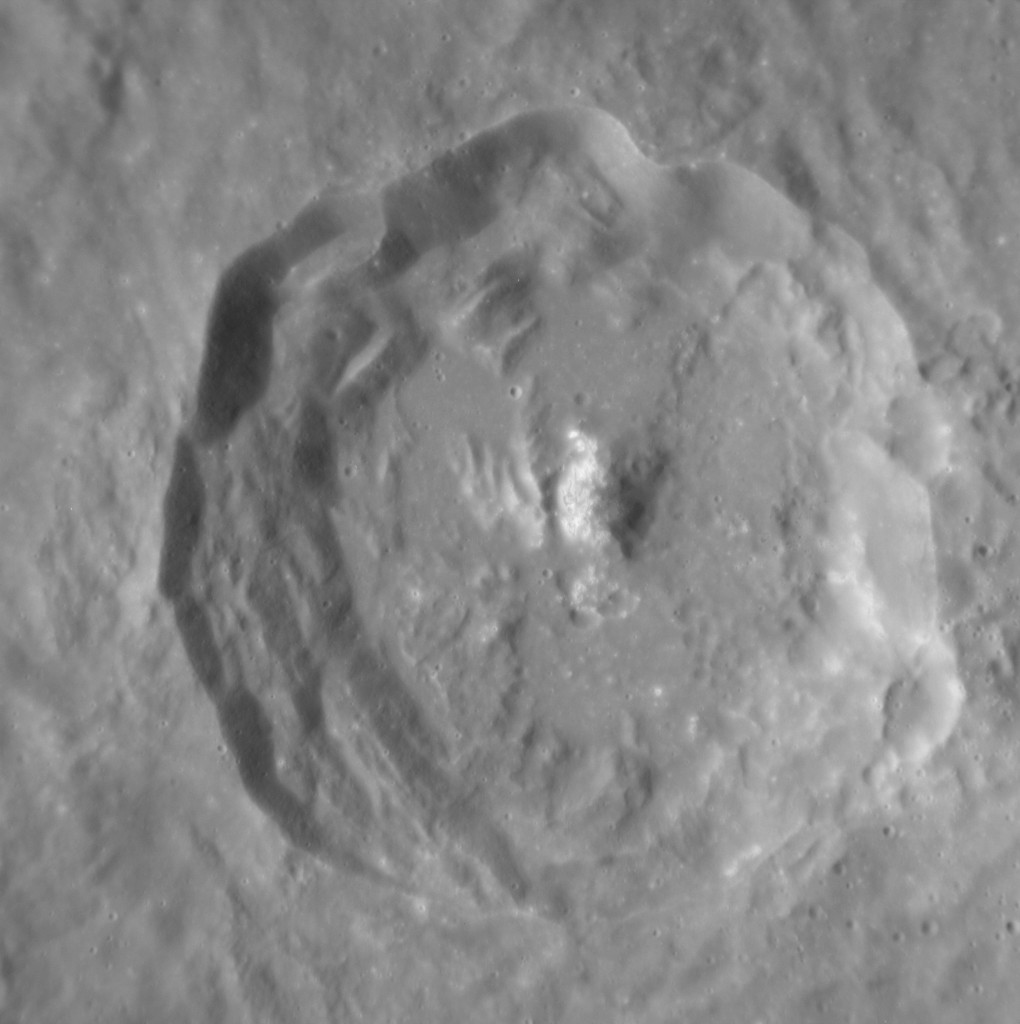
- MESSENGER NAC image
- Feature type: Central-peak impact crater
- Location: Shakespeare quadrangle, Mercury
- Coordinates: 25°N 93.66°W
- Diameter: 33 km (21 mi)
- Eponym: Du Fu

Du Fu is a crater on Mercury. Its name was adopted by the International Astronomical Union (IAU) on September 25, 2015. Du Fu is named for the Chinese poet Du Fu.

Hollows are present on Du Fu's central peak.

A large unnamed crater to the west of Du Fu is crossed by a prominent scarp.

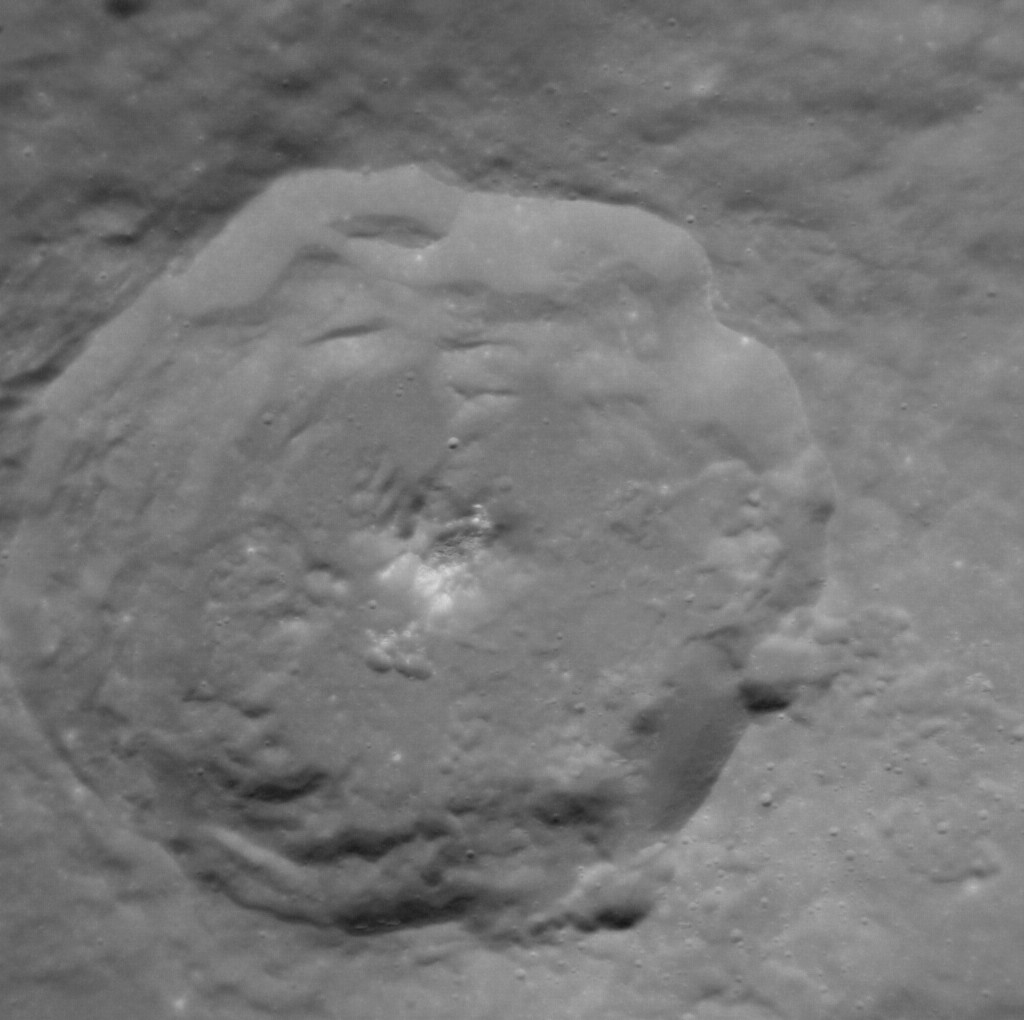
Oblique view

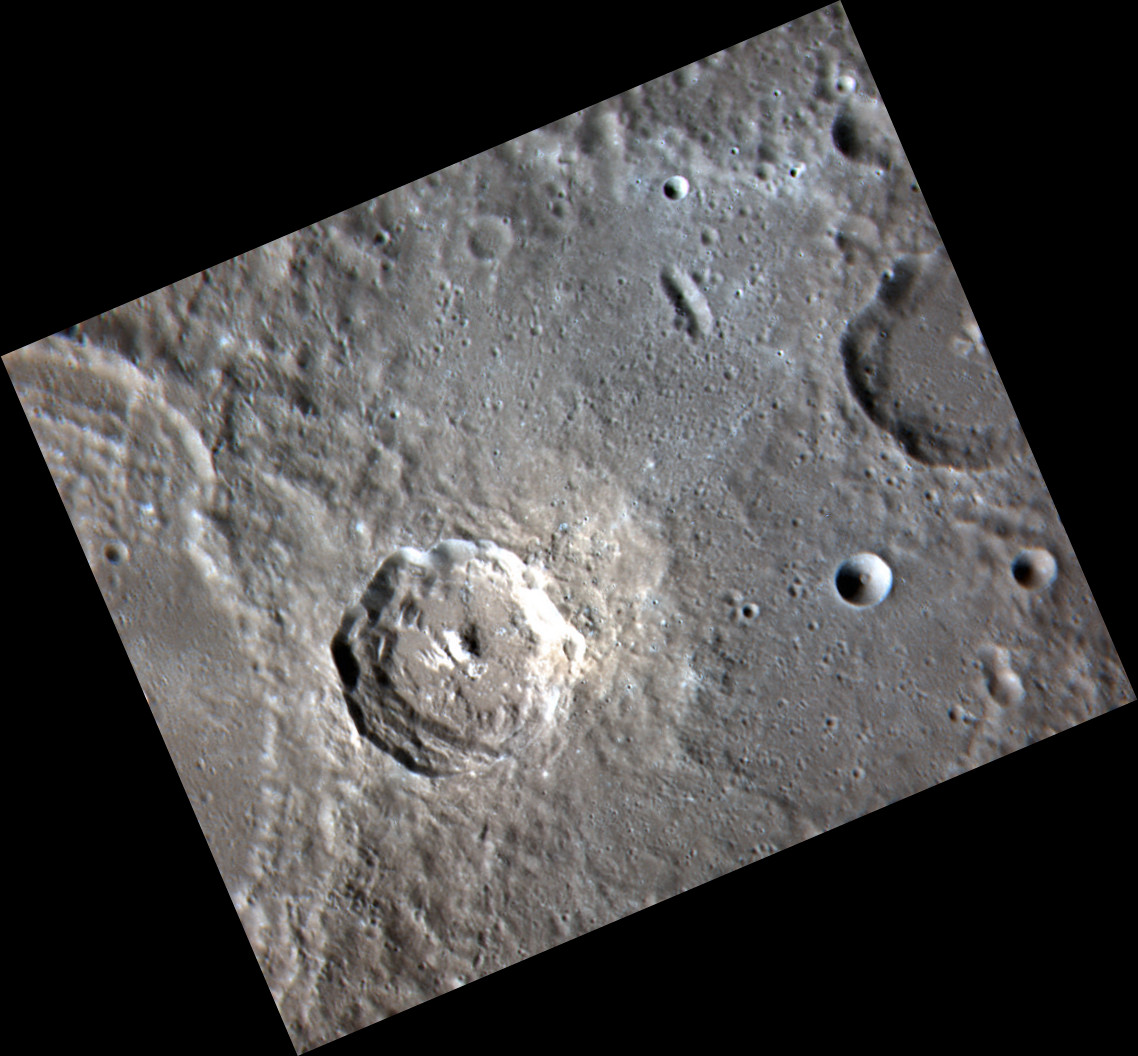
Approximate color image
