= Yamada (crater) =

Crater on Mercury

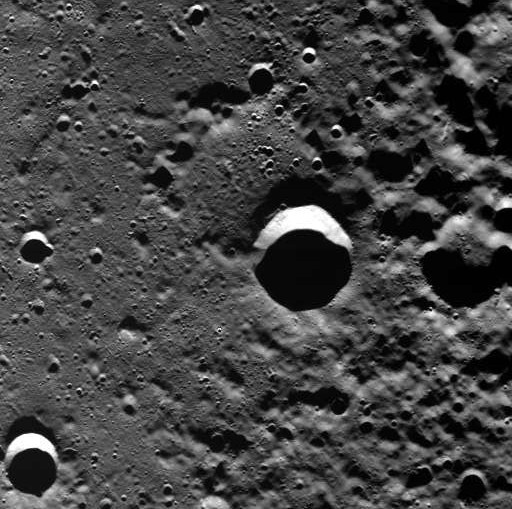
- MESSENGER WAC
- Planet: Mercury
- Coordinates: 82.54°N 136.16°E
- Quadrangle: Borealis
- Diameter: 17.1 km (10.6 mi)
- Eponym: Kosaku Yamada

Yamada is a crater on Mercury. It has a diameter of 17.1 kilometres (10.6 miles). Its name was adopted by the International Astronomical Union (IAU) on November 4, 2015. Yamada is named for the Japanese composer and conductor Kosaku Yamada. The crater was referred to as n5 in scientific literature prior to naming.
