= Flaubert (crater) =

Crater on Mercury

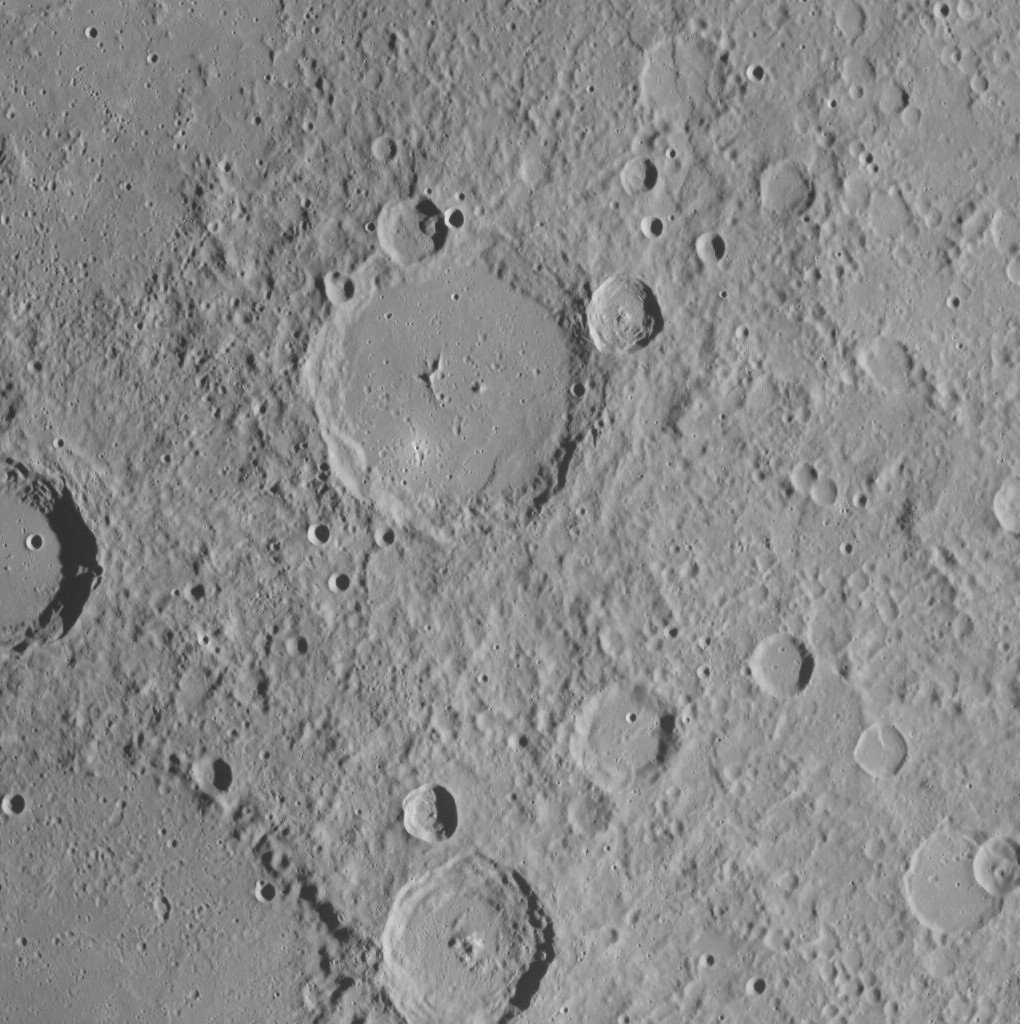
- MESSENGER WAC
- Feature type: Impact crater
- Location: Beethoven quadrangle, Mercury
- Coordinates: 13.83°S 72.70°W
- Diameter: 95 km (59 mi)
- Eponym: Gustave Flaubert

Flaubert is a crater on Mercury. Its name was adopted by the International Astronomical Union (IAU) in 1985. Flaubert is named for the French novelist Gustave Flaubert, who lived from 1821 to 1880.

Flaubert is northeast of the large Beethoven basin.

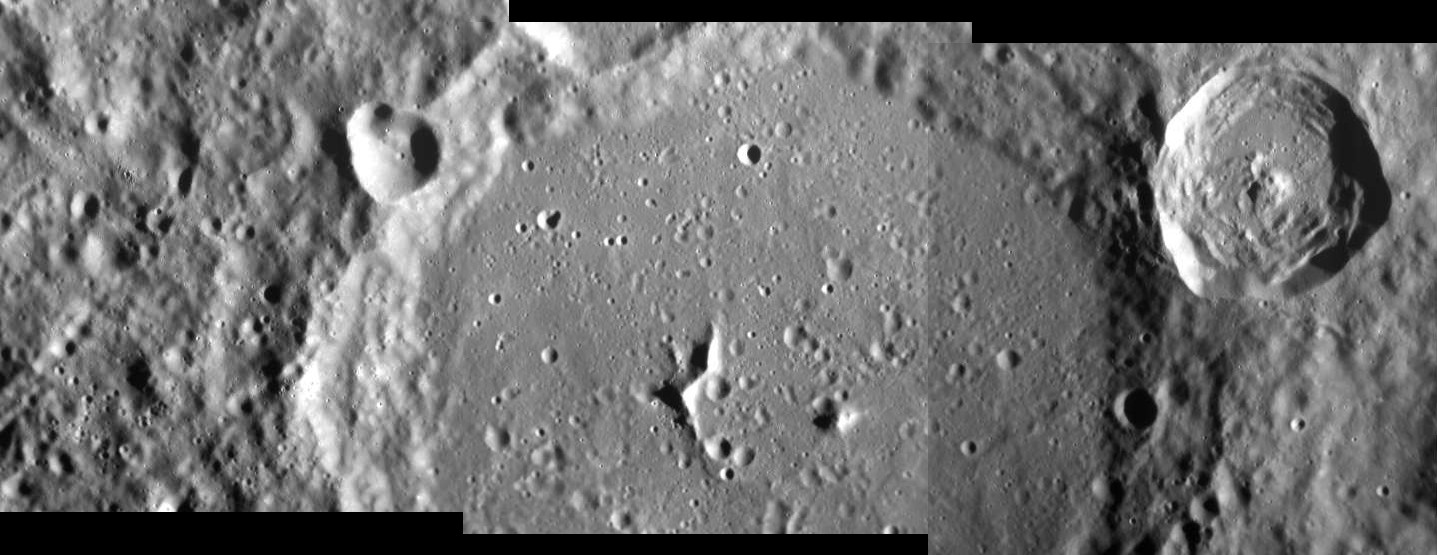
Northern Flaubert crater
