= Rude (crater) =

Crater on Mercury

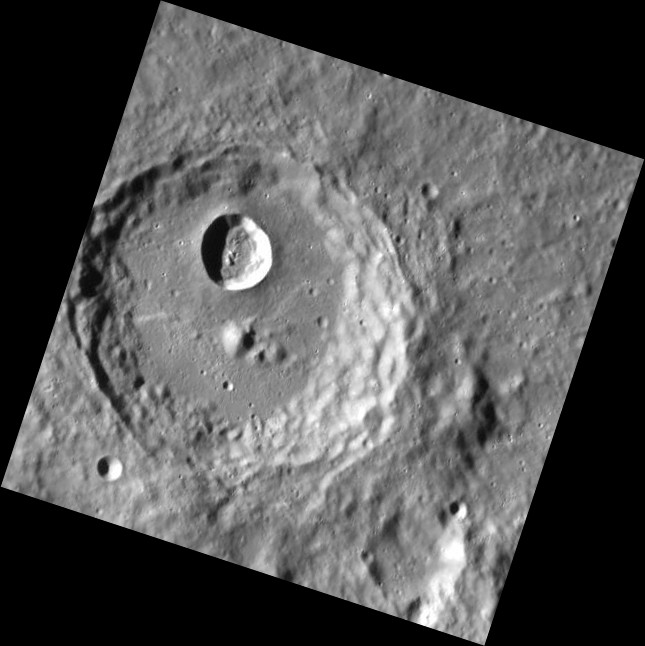
- MESSENGER NAC
- Planet: Mercury
- Coordinates: 33.22°S 79.29°W
- Quadrangle: Discovery
- Diameter: 68 km (42 mi)
- Eponym: François Rude

Rude is an impact crater on the planet Mercury. It is named for the French sculptor François Rude. Its name was approved by the International Astronomical Union in 1985.

Rude lies to the southwest of the large crater Haydn.
