= Ictinus (crater) =

Crater on Mercury

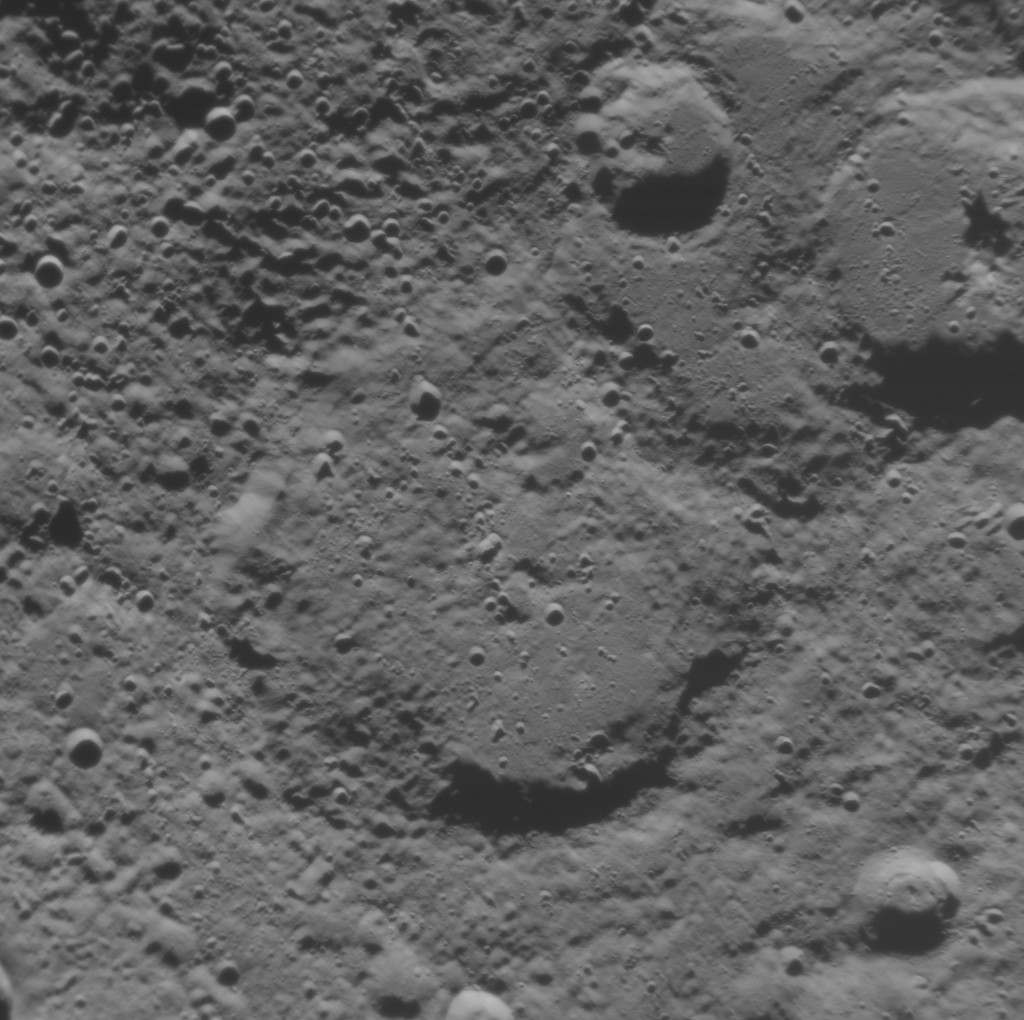
- MESSENGER NAC of Ictinus
- Feature type: Impact crater
- Location: Bach quadrangle, Mercury
- Coordinates: 79.56°S 174.24°W
- Diameter: 58.03 km (36.06 mi)
- Eponym: Ictinus

Ictinus is a crater on Mercury. Its depth from crater floor to rim is 4.8 kilometres (3 mi). Its name was adopted by the International Astronomical Union in 1976. Ictinus is named for the Ancient Greek architect Ictinus, who lived in the 5th century BCE.

The northern rim of Ictinus is in permanent shadow.
