= Otaared Planitia =

Geologic basin on Mercury

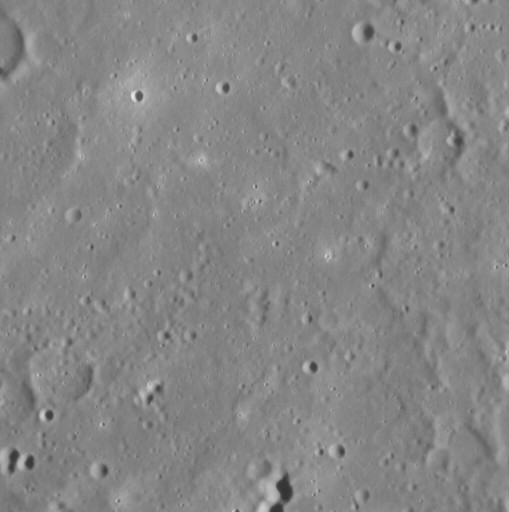
- Typical smooth plains of Otaared Planitia
- Location: Derain quadrangle, Mercury
- Coordinates: 18.26°N 337.61°W
- Eponym: Arabic word for Mercury

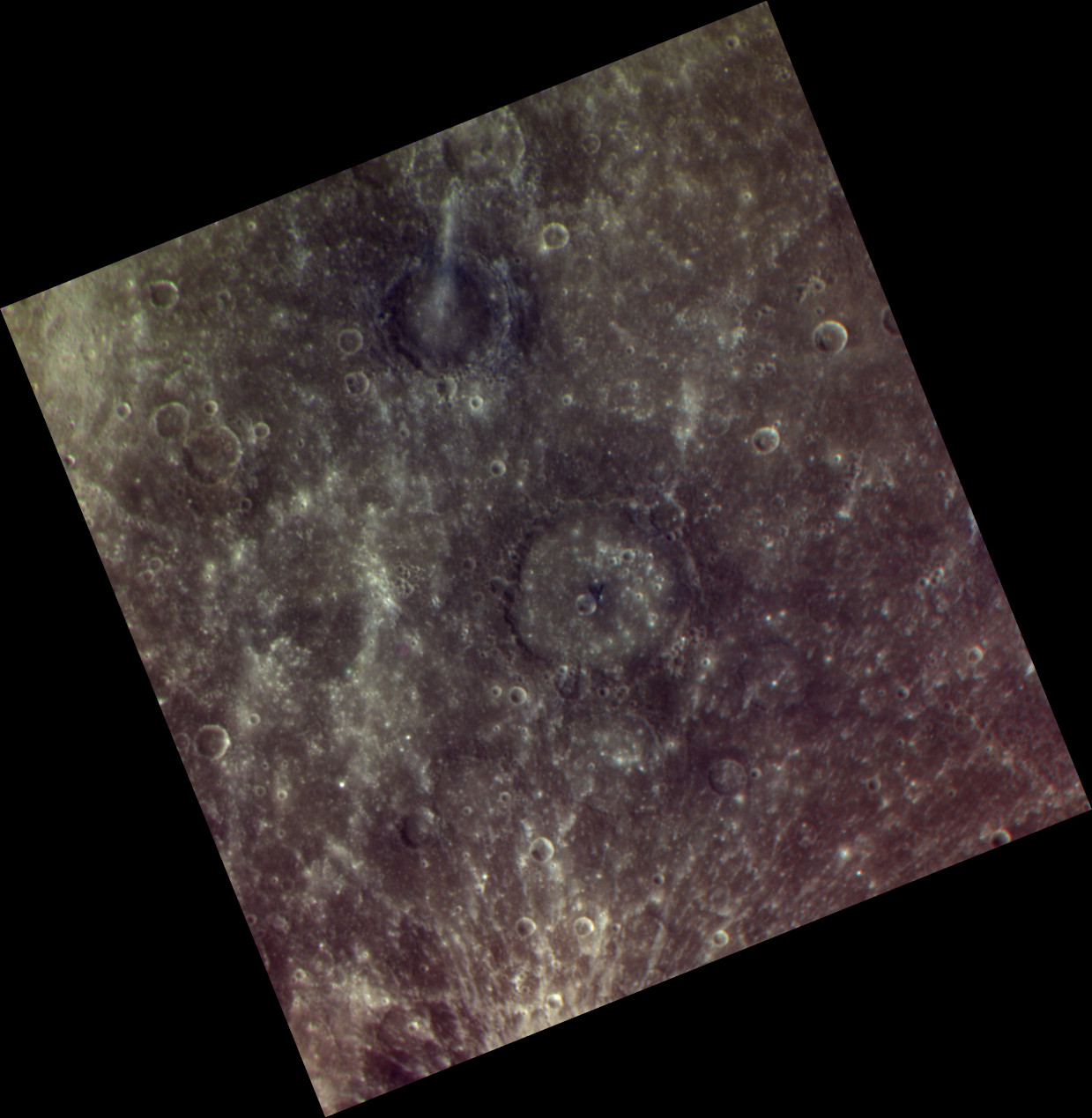
Exaggerated color image showing central Otaared Planitia

Otaared Planitia is a smooth plain on Mercury. It was named for the Arabic word for the planet Mercury, in 2017 by the IAU. The plain is approximately 470 km (290 mi) in diameter.

There are no named craters within the plain, but the small crater Petipa is just south of it.

Otaared Planitia is at the center of an ancient impact basin now known as Calder-Hodgkins. The basin was originally identified as b30. The basin is named after Calder crater near the south rim, and Hodgkins crater near the north rim. It is about 1,460 km (910 mi) in diameter, and the scarps called Grifo Rupes form the southwestern margin of the basin (see Villa-Lobos crater).
