= Rustaveli (crater) =

Crater on Mercury

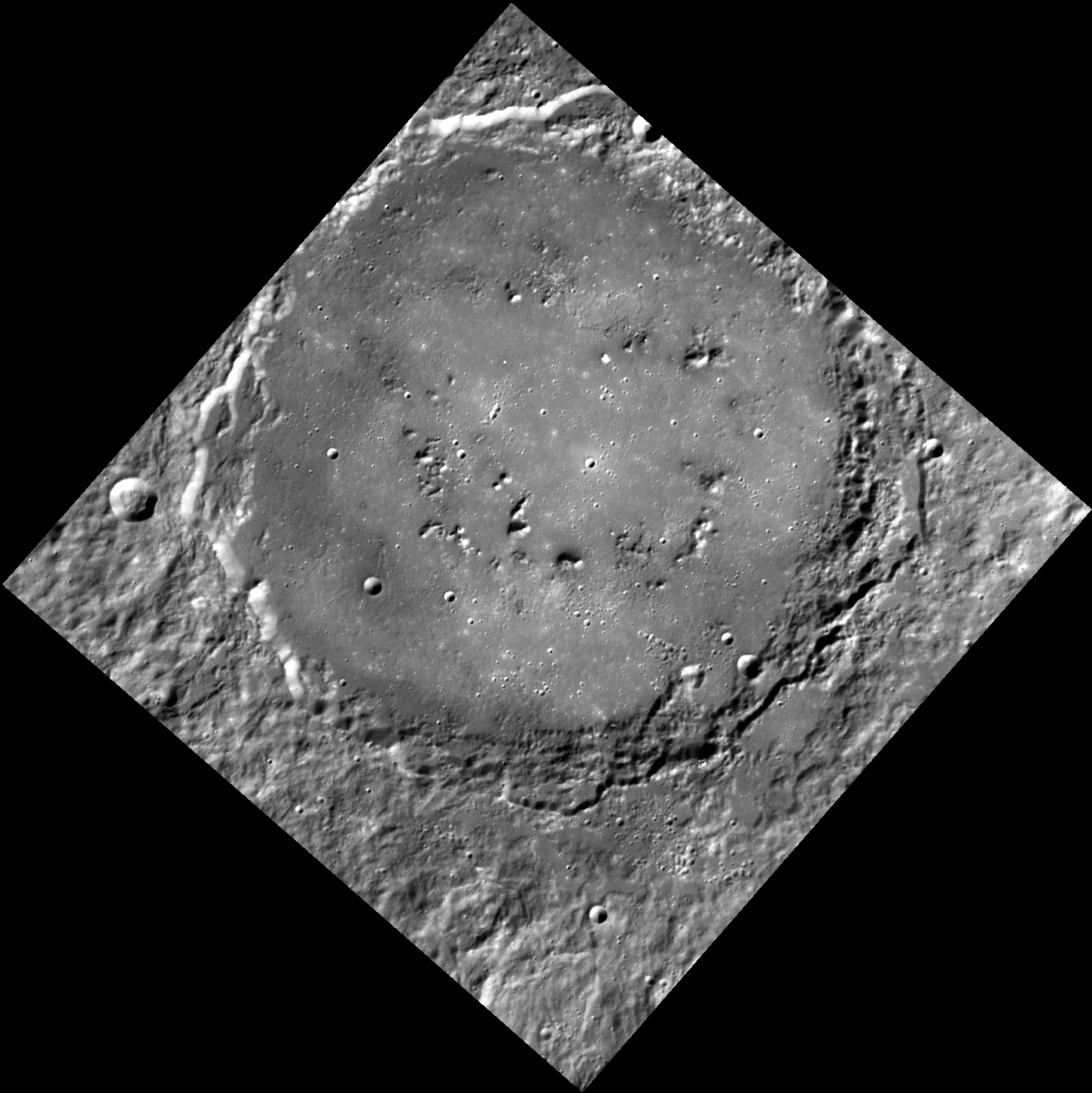
- MESSENGER image
- Planet: Mercury
- Coordinates: 52.41°N 277.26°W
- Quadrangle: Hokusai
- Diameter: 200.0 km (124.3 mi)
- Eponym: Shota Rustaveli

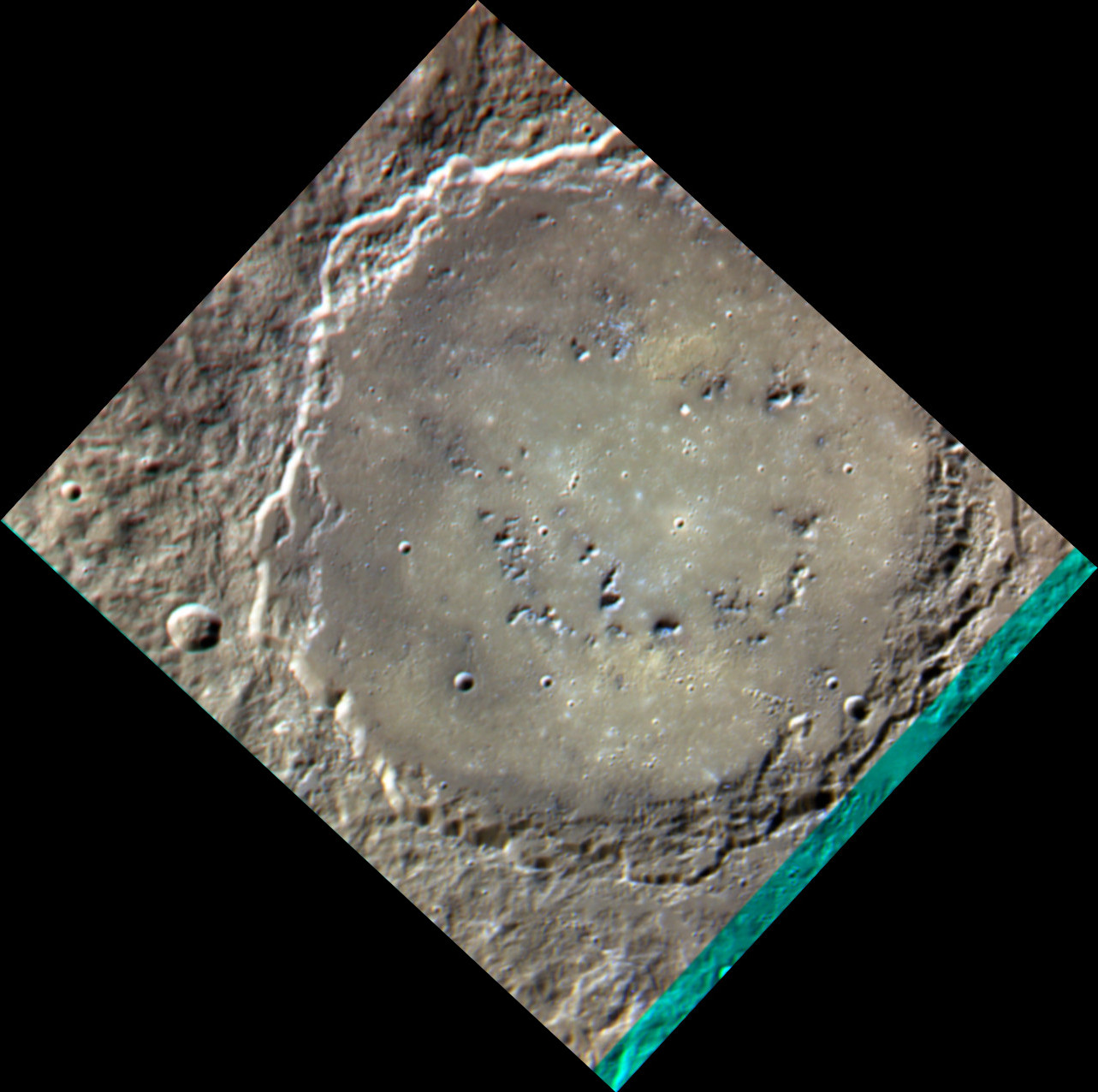
Rustaveli crater in exaggerated color

Rustaveli is a crater on Mercury. Its name was adopted by the International Astronomical Union in 2012, after the Georgian poet Shota Rustaveli.

Rustaveli is one of 110 peak ring basins on Mercury. The interior has mostly been flooded by impact melt or volcanic deposits.

A confirmed dark spot is present in northern Rustaveli. This dark spot is associated with hollows (see below).

To the east of Rustaveli is Kulthum crater. The crater Copland and Nathair Facula are to the southwest.

== Hollows ==
Hollows are present on the floor of Rustaveli crater.

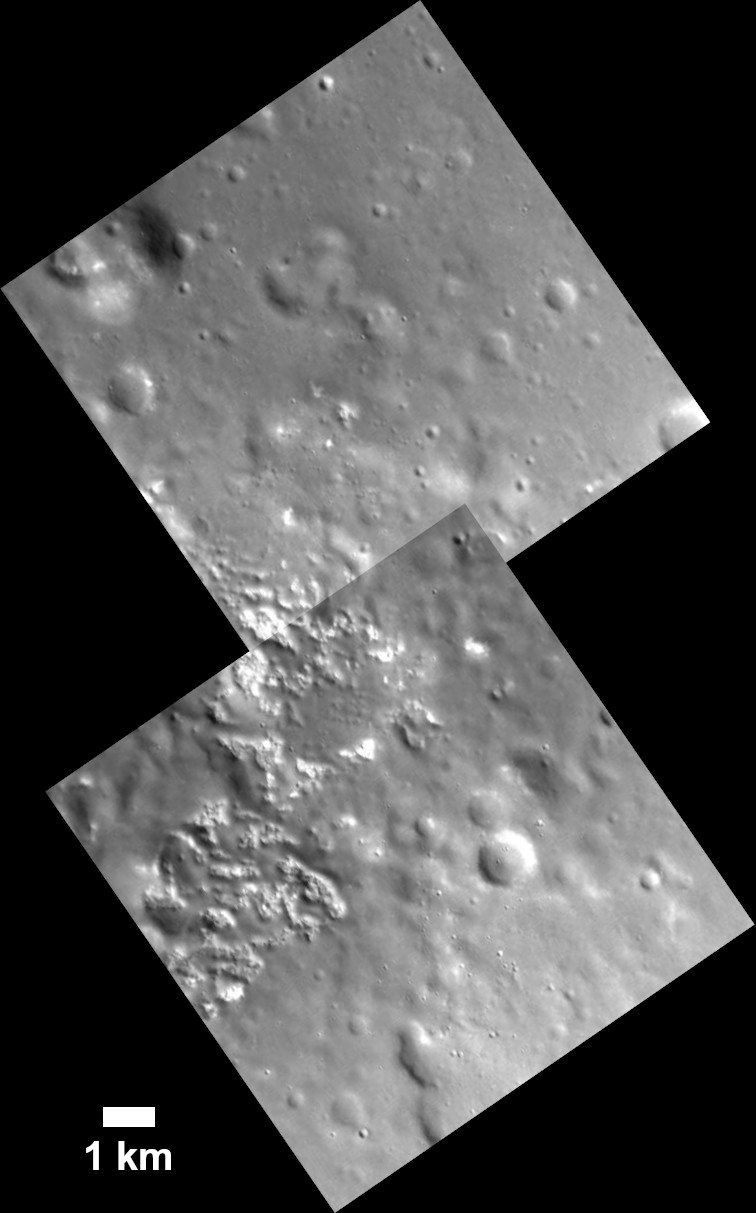
Hollows associated with the dark spot in north-central Rustaveli

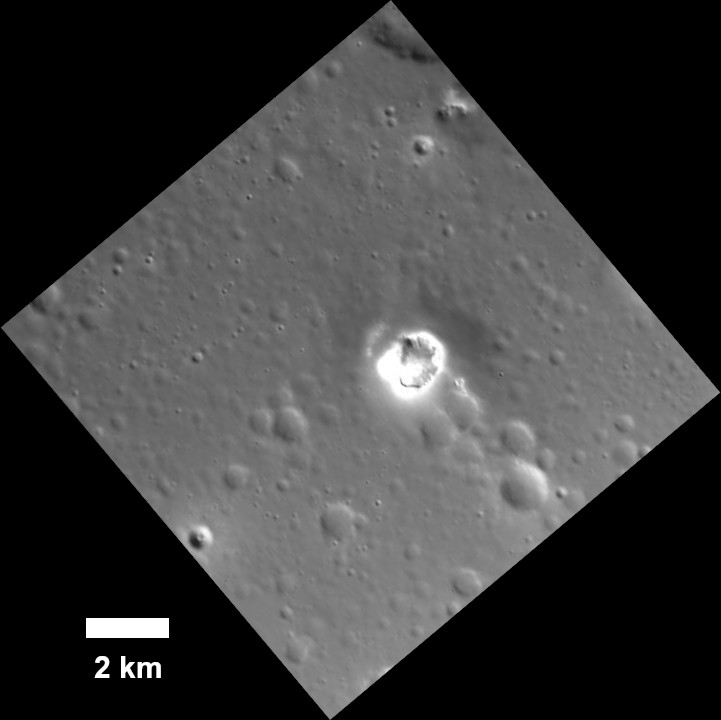
Bright hollow north of the center of Rustaveli

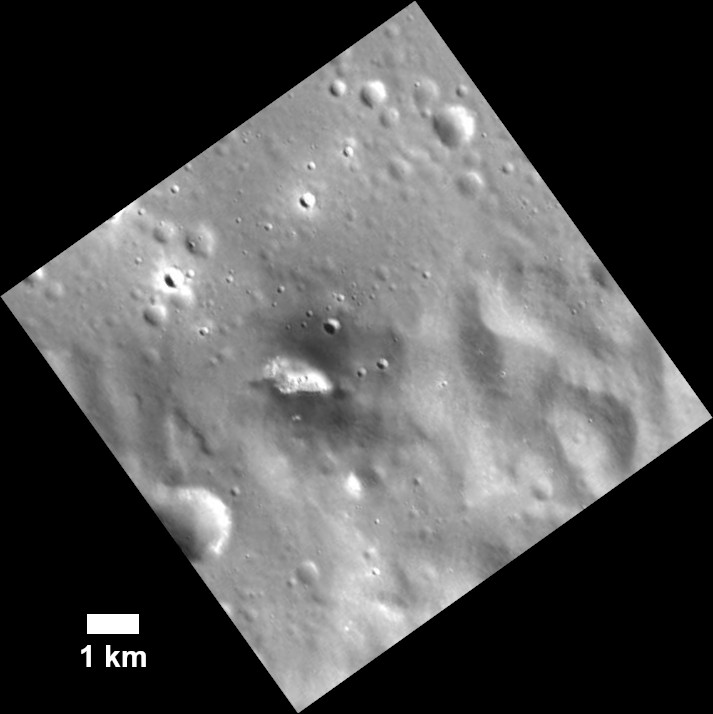
Hollow on the southern rim with halo of low reflectance material
