= Suge Facula =

Region on Mercury

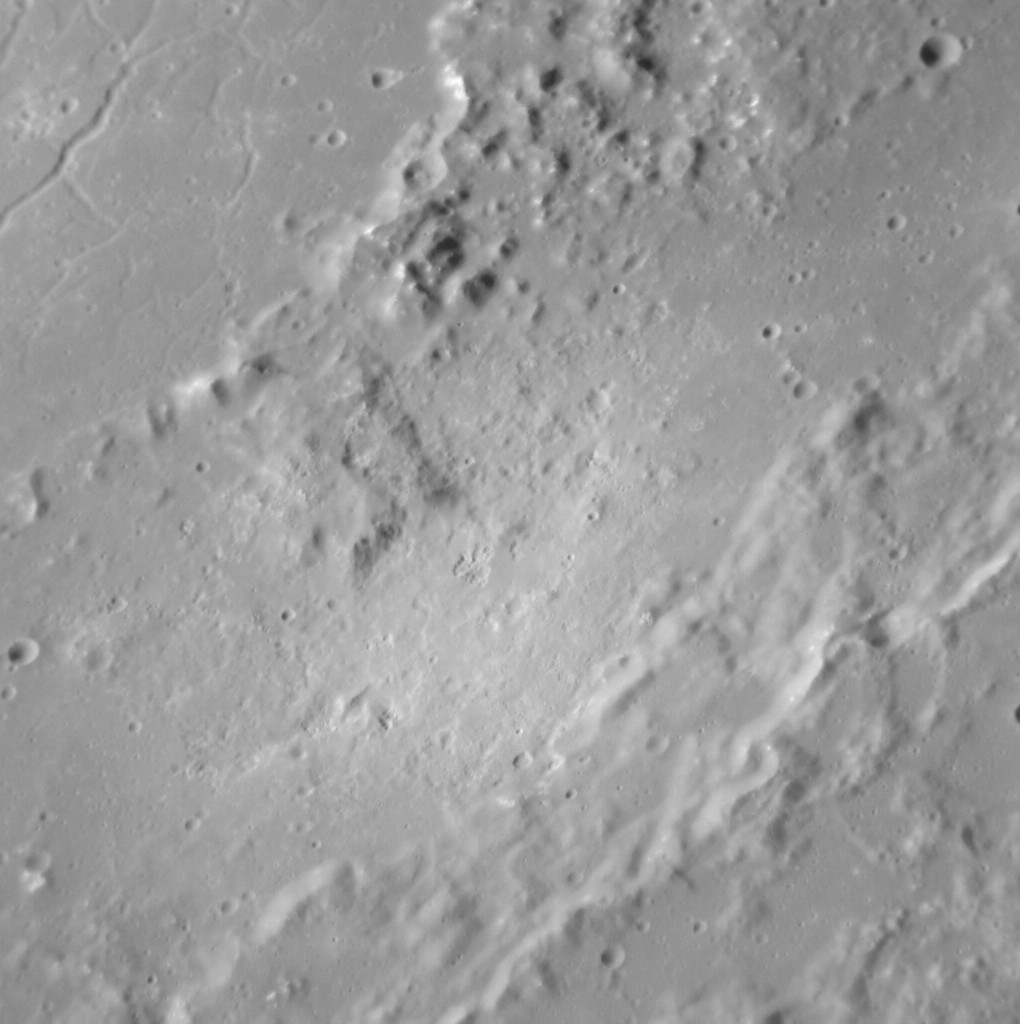
Suge Facula within Rachmaninoff crater.

Suge Facula is a bright region on the surface of Mercury, located at 26.1 N, 300.4 W. It was named by the IAU in 2018. Suge is the Basque word for snake.

== Location ==
Suge Facula lies between the inner peak ring and rim in the southeast portion of Rachmaninoff crater, in the Hokusai quadrangle of Mercury.

== Gallery ==
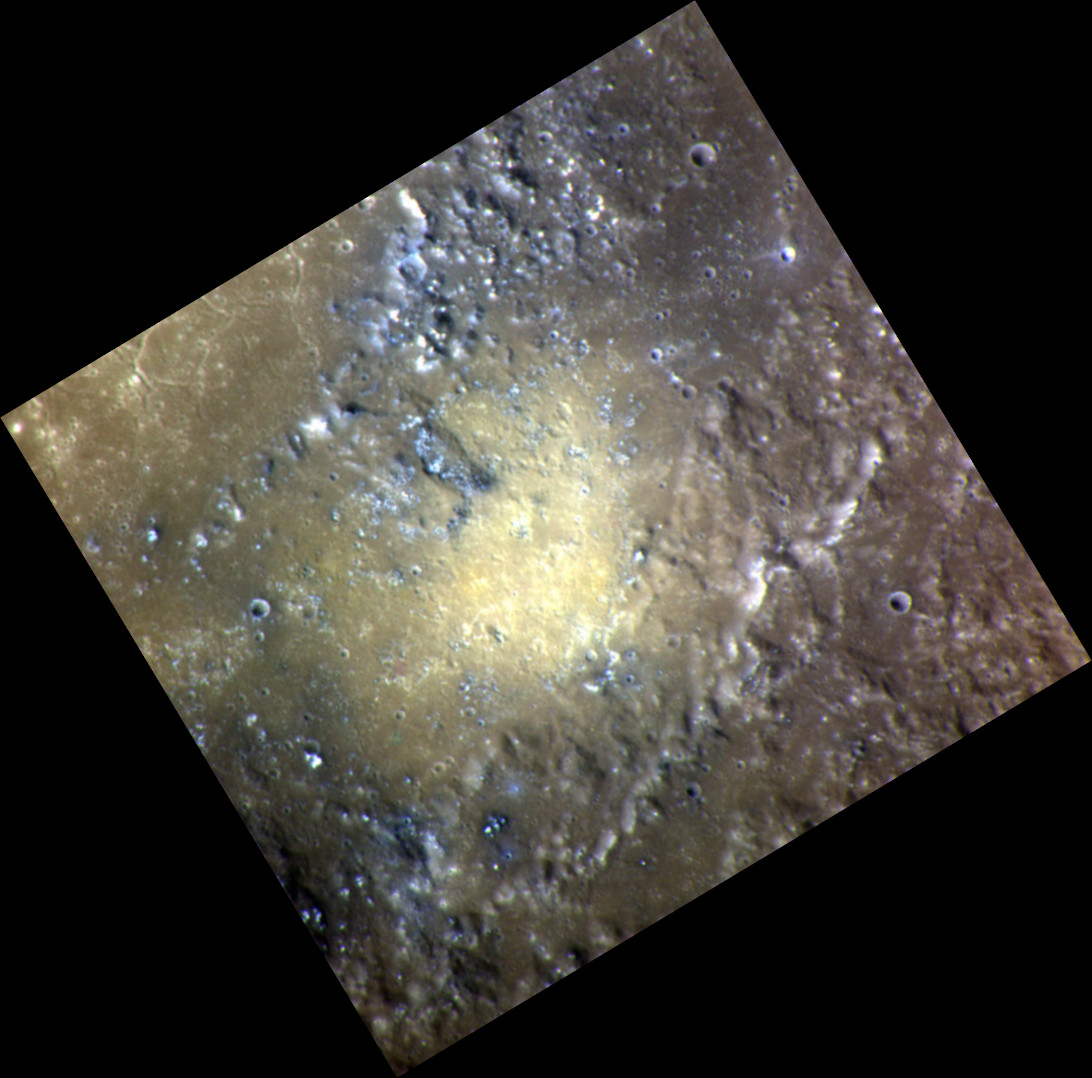
Suge Facula in exaggerated color

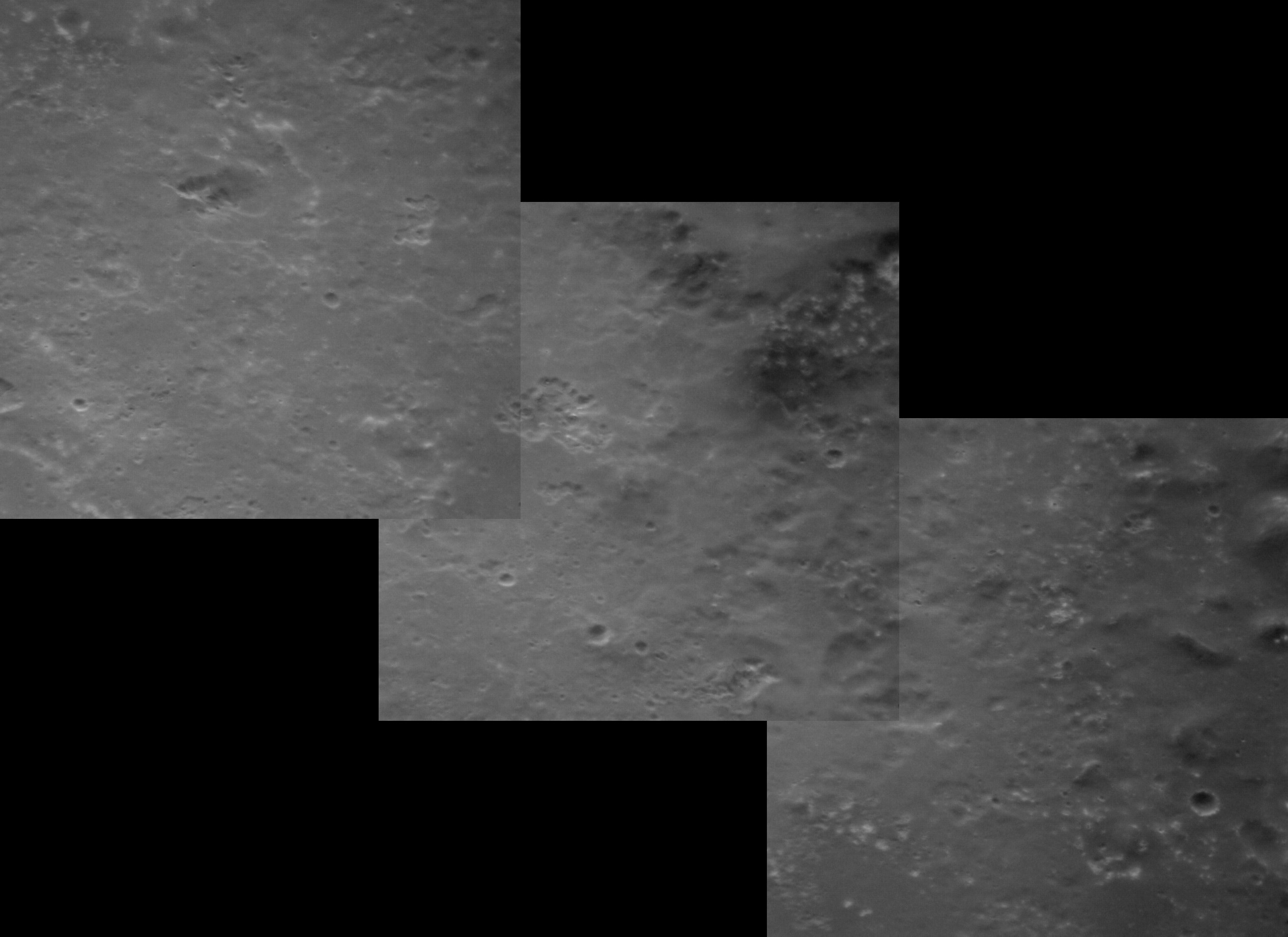
Oblique view of most of the facula, looking southwest. The distance from upper left to lower right is about 57 km.
