= Asawa (crater) =

Crater on Mercury

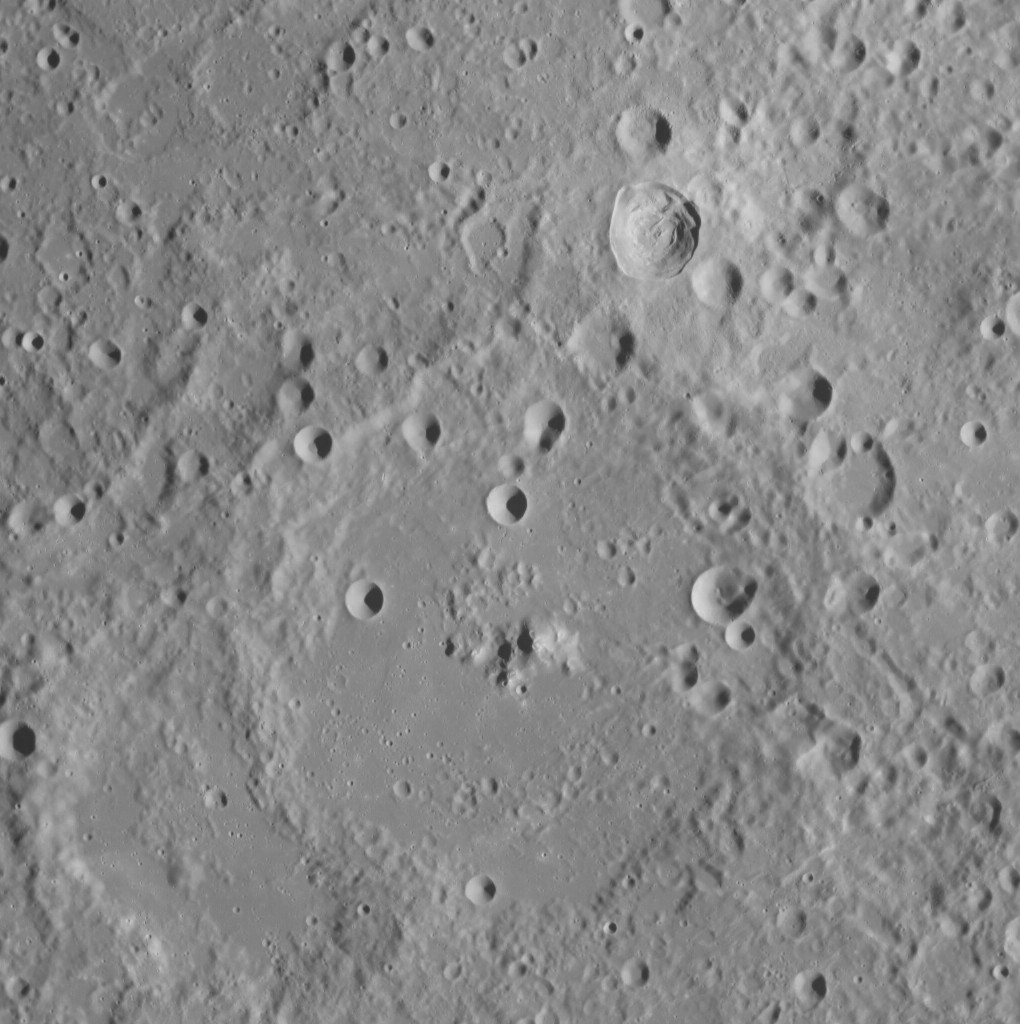
- MESSENGER WAC
- Planet: Mercury
- Coordinates: 27.26°N 315.28°W
- Quadrangle: Hokusai
- Diameter: 130.0 km (80.8 mi)
- Eponym: Ruth Asawa

Asawa is a crater on Mercury. Its name was adopted by the International Astronomical Union (IAU) on November 14, 2024. The crater is named for Japanese-American sculptor Ruth Aiko Asawa.

Asawa is west of the large Rachmaninoff crater. An unnamed crater with a bright ray system is located northeast of Asawa.

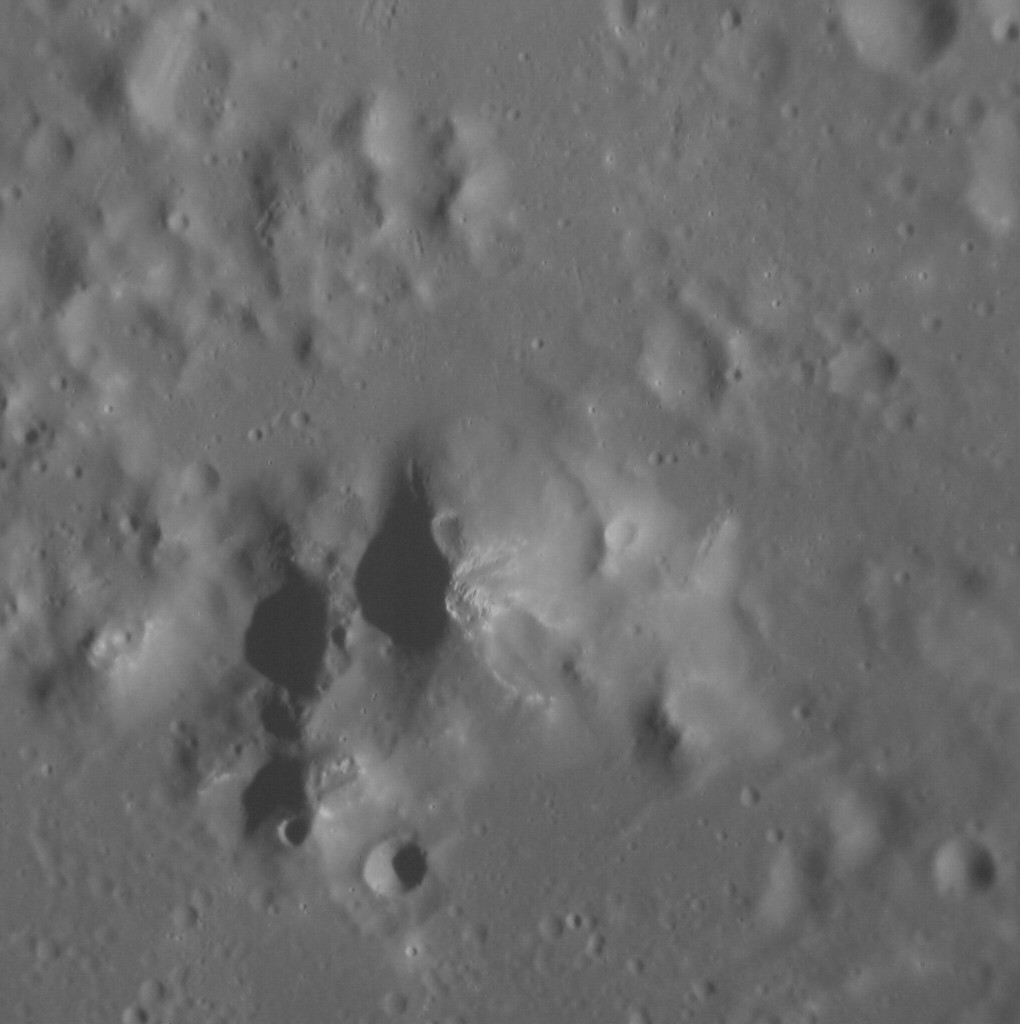
Hollows are present on some of the peaks in Asawa's central peak complex

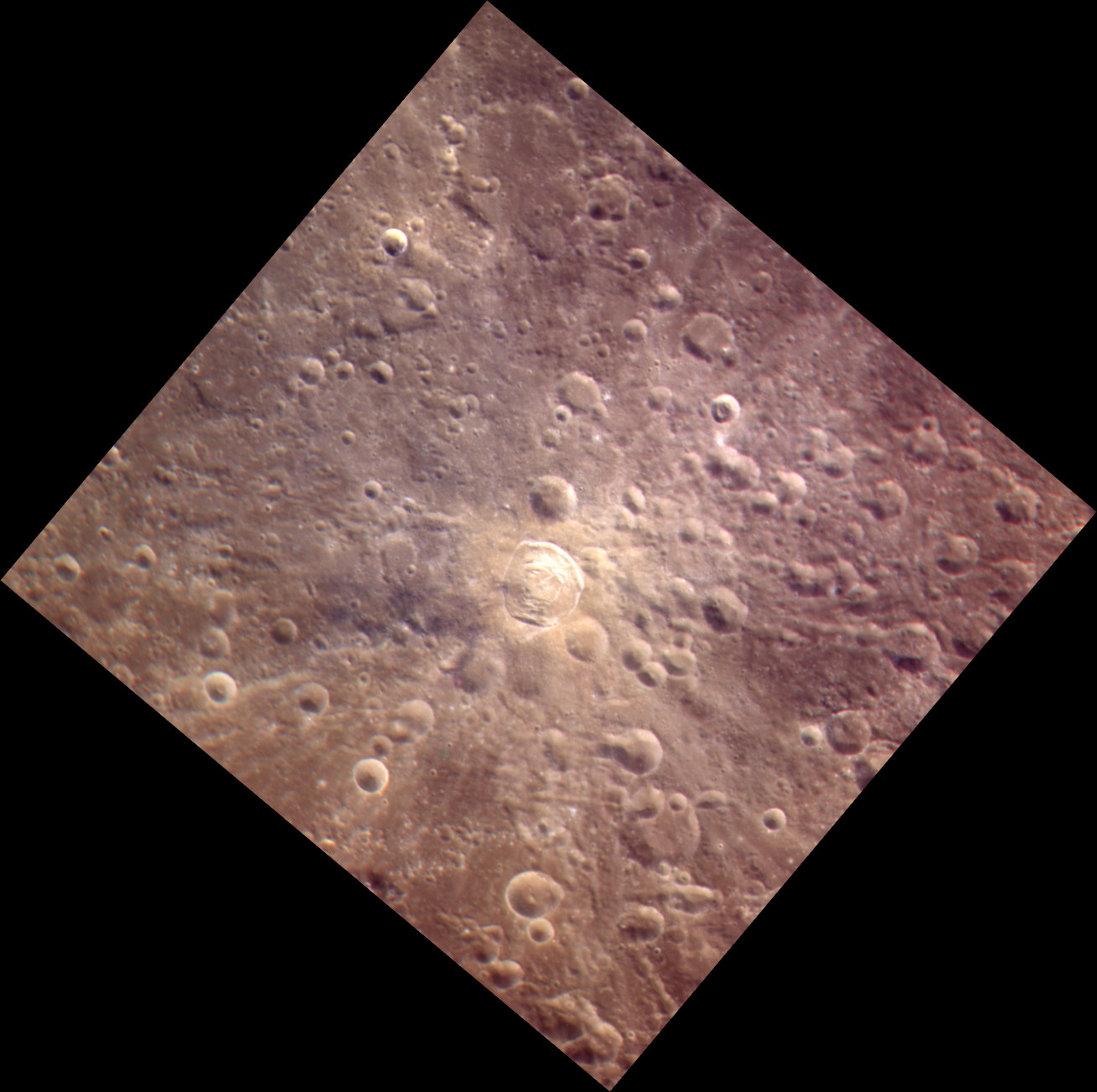
Exaggerated color view of the crater with bright ray system northeast of Asawa
