= Rachmaninoff (crater) =

Crater on Mercury

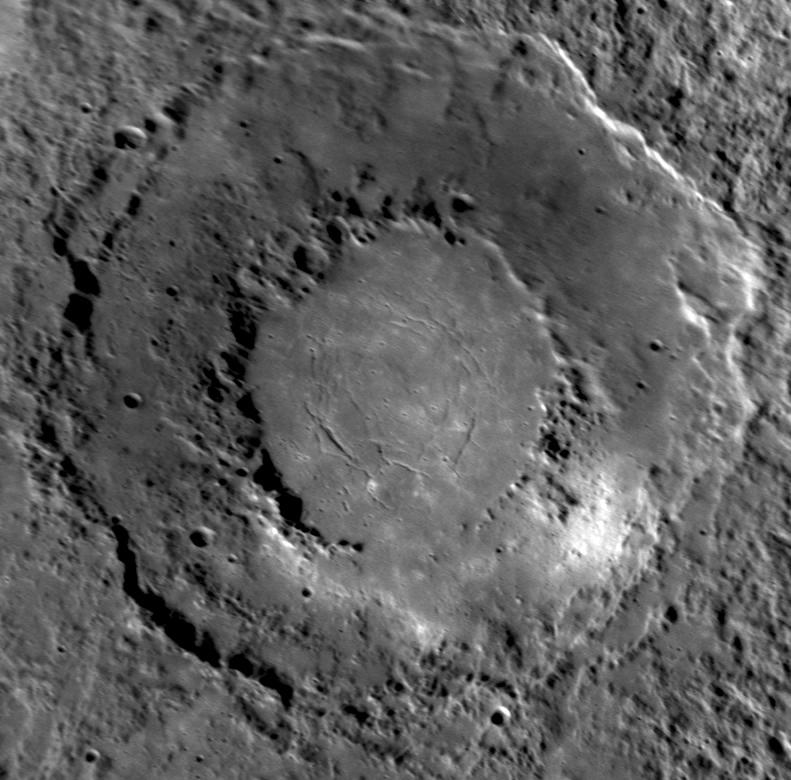
- MESSENGER image
- Feature type: Peak-ring impact basin
- Location: Hokusai quadrangle, Mercury
- Coordinates: 27.6°N 302.4°W
- Diameter: 290 km (180 mi)
- Eponym: Sergei Rachmaninoff

Rachmaninoff is an impact crater on Mercury. This basin, first imaged in its entirety during MESSENGER's third Mercury flyby, was quickly identified as a feature of high scientific interest, because of its fresh appearance, its distinctively colored interior plains, and the extensional troughs on its floor. The morphology of Rachmaninoff is similar to that of Raditladi, which is one of the youngest impact basins on Mercury. The age of Raditladi is estimated at one billion years. Rachmaninoff appears to be only slightly older. The crater is named after Sergei Rachmaninoff, a Russian composer, pianist, and conductor (1873–1943).

== Characteristics ==
The central part of Rachmaninoff is occupied by a peak ring 130 km in diameter and somewhat elongated in the north–south direction. The area within it is covered by bright reddish smooth plains, which are different in color from the plains outside the peak ring. These plains are likely to be of volcanic origin because they show signs of flow. They also over-topped and covered the southern portion of the peak ring itself. The lowest recorded elevation on Mercury, 5380 meters below the global average, lies within Rachmaninoff Basin. Rachmaninoff is one of 110 peak ring basins on Mercury.

The smooth plains inside the peak ring were deformed by a set of concentric graben (troughs) much like those inside Raditladi. The troughs are located at half the distance to the peak ring from the center of the crater. Rachmaninoff is the fourth impact crater on Mercury (after Caloris, Rembrandt and Raditladi), where extensional tectonic features have been observed. The formation mechanism of the graben remains unknown.

A distinct bright area between the inner peak ring and the rim in the southeast portion of the crater is known as Suge Facula.

To the north of Rachmaninoff is Neidr Facula, and to the northeast is Nathair Facula. To the west is Asawa crater, and to the southwest are the Calypso Rupes.

== Views ==
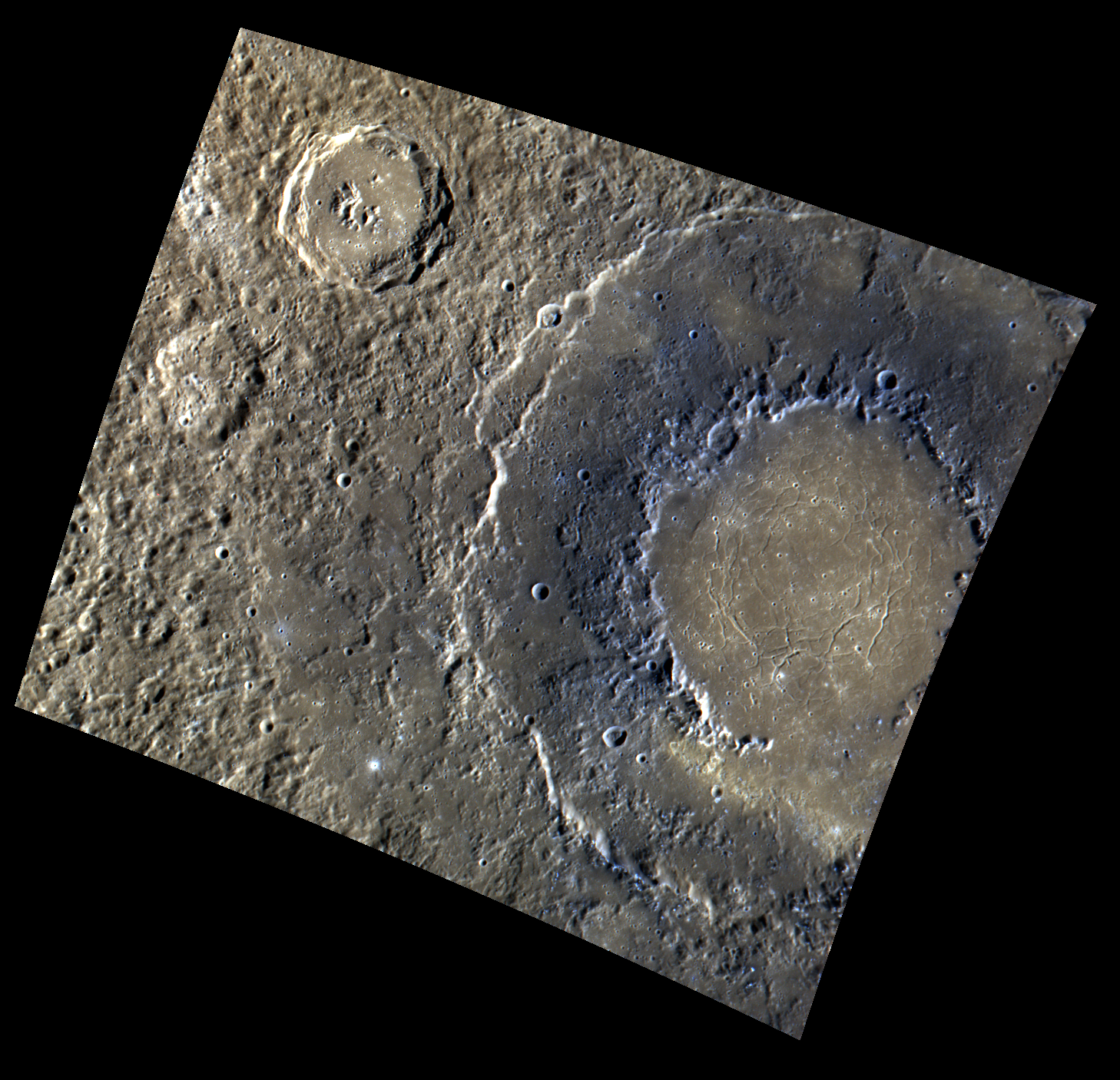
Rachmaninoff crater in approximate color

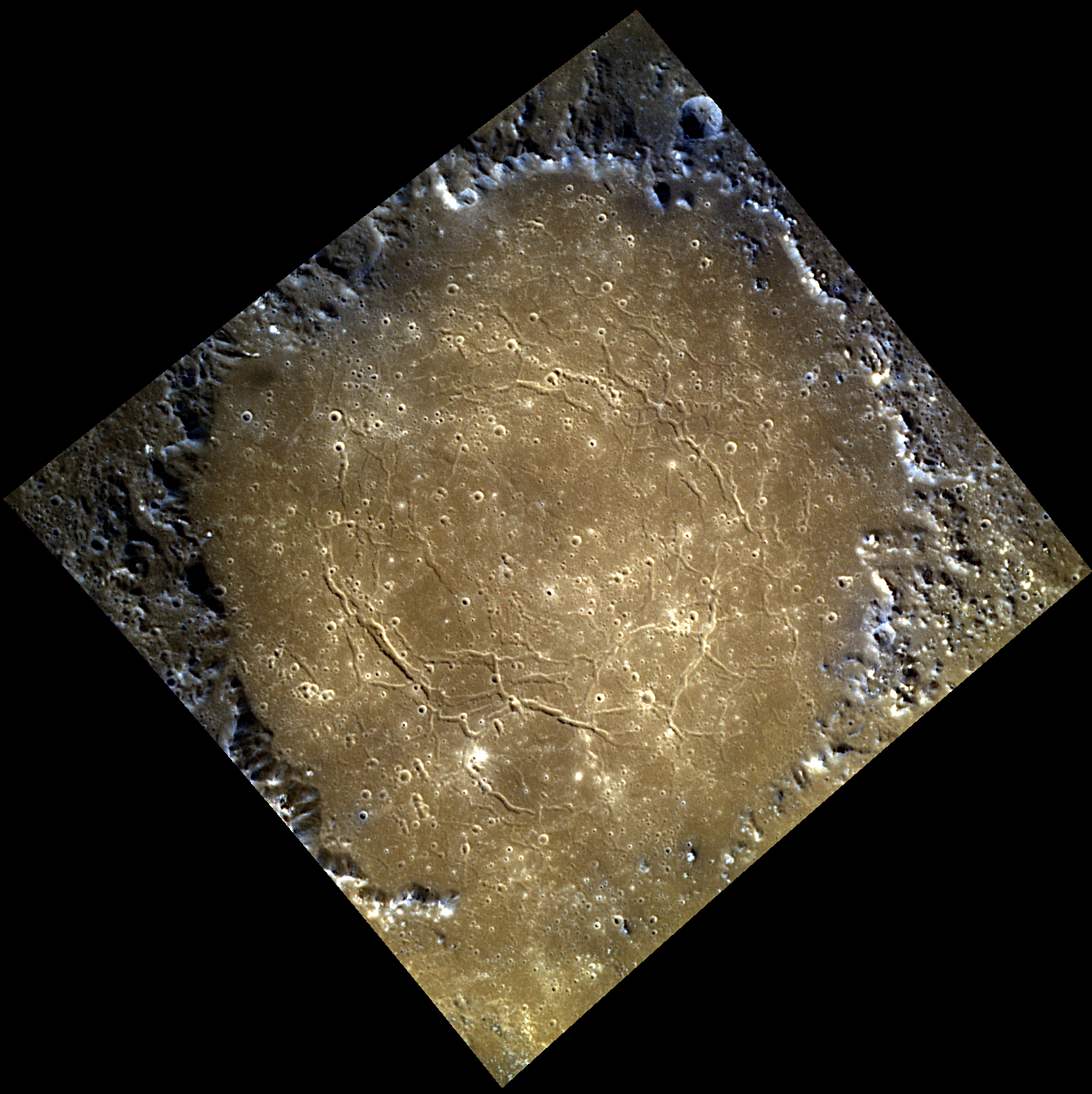
The interior of the central peak ring, showing detail of the ring of graben

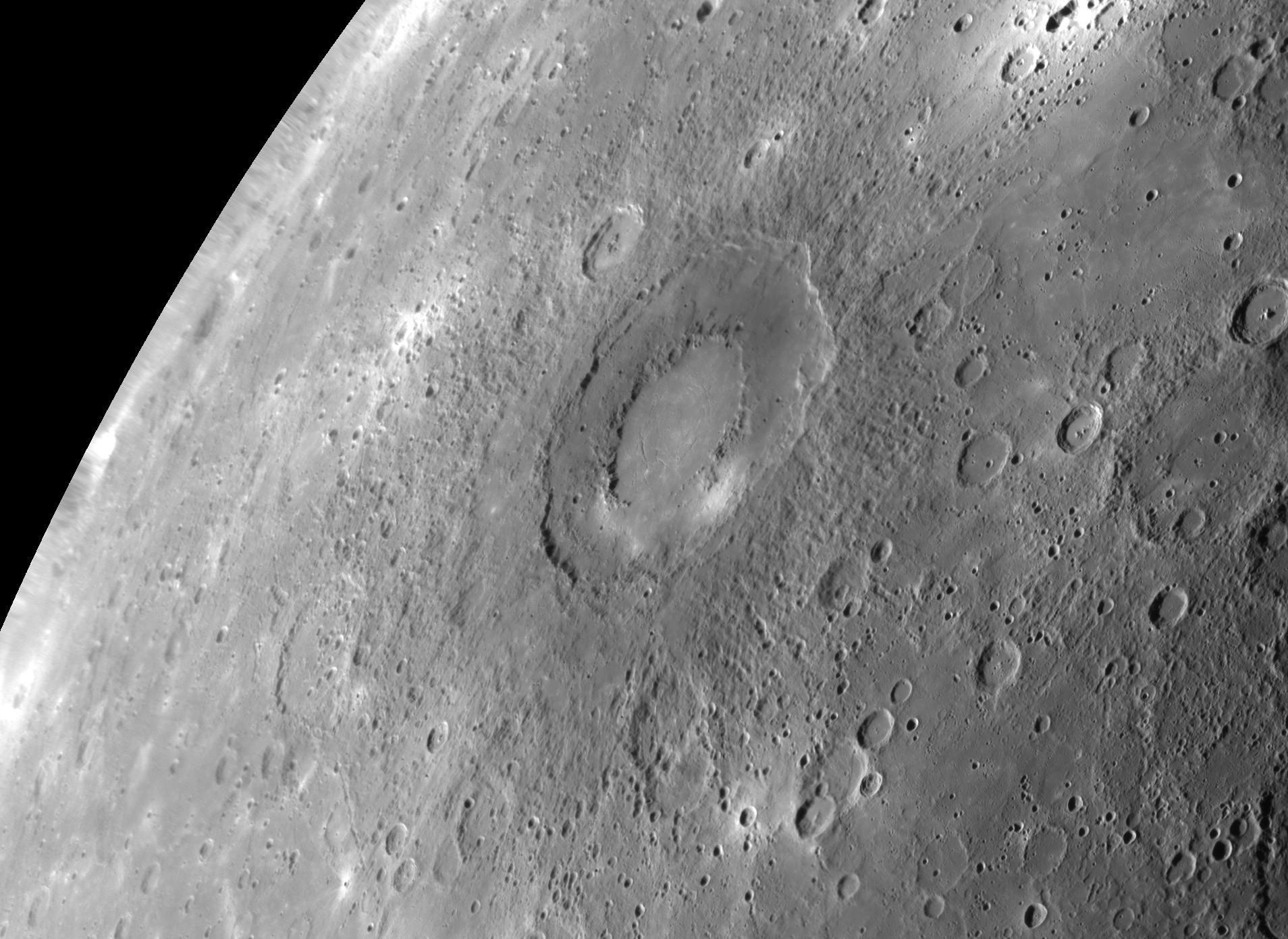
Mosaic from MESSENGER's third flyby

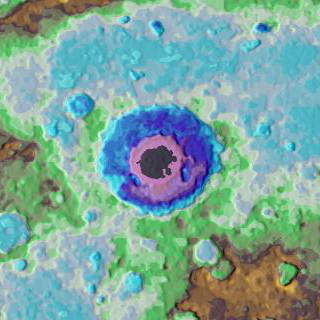
Rachmaninoff Basin topography, showing that its center is one of the lowest places on the planet at approximately 5 km below the global average
