= Villa-Lobos (crater) =

Crater on Mercury

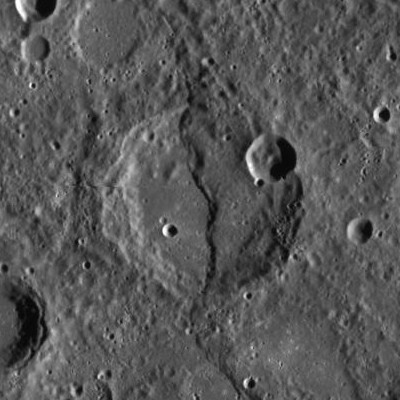
- MESSENGER WAC mosaic
- Feature type: Impact crater
- Location: Derain quadrangle, Mercury
- Coordinates: 5.27°N 353.21°W
- Diameter: 67 km (42 mi)
- Eponym: Heitor Villa-Lobos

Villa-Lobos is a crater on Mercury. Its name was adopted by the International Astronomical Union (IAU) on September 25, 2015. Villa-Lobos is named for the Brazilian composer Heitor Villa-Lobos.

The scarp called Grifo Rupes cuts across Villa-Lobos north to south, and extends to the north through several unnamed craters. Grifo Rupes form the southwest margin of an ancient impact basin now known as Calder-Hodgkins. The basin was originally identified as b30. The basin is named after Calder crater near the south rim, and Hodgkins crater near the north rim. It is about 1,460 km (910 mi) in diameter.

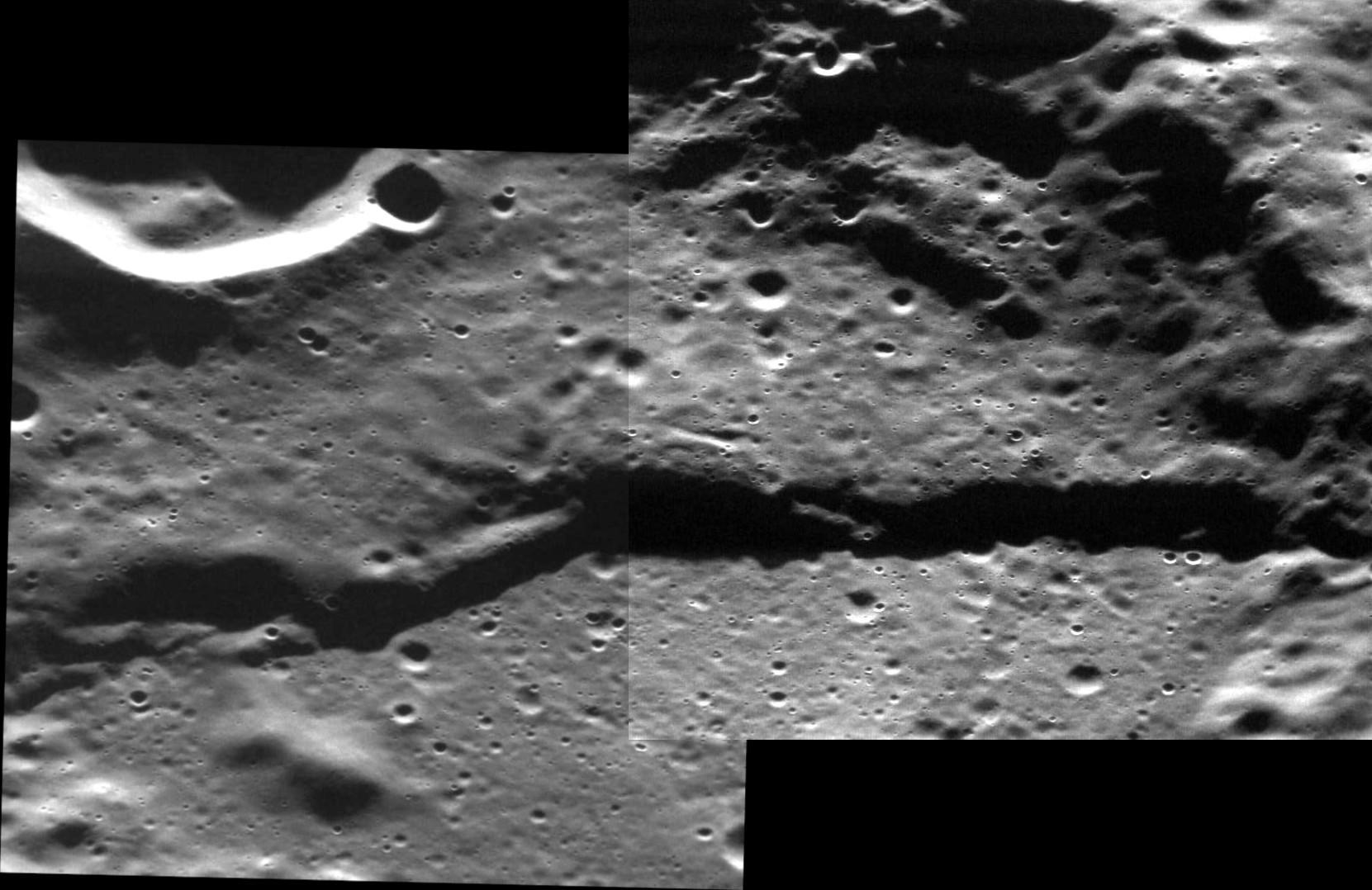
Grifo Rupes cutting across Villa-Lobos crater
