= Petipa (crater) =

Crater on Mercury

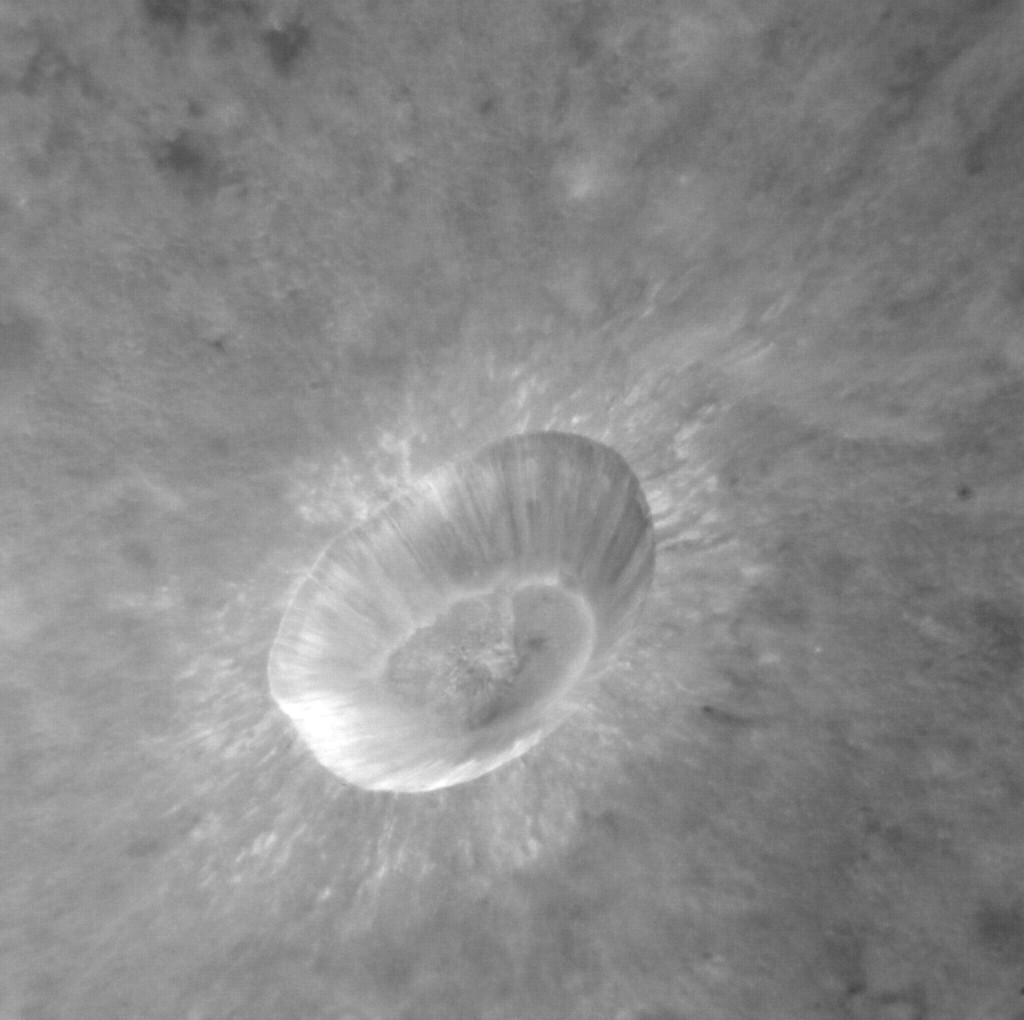
- MESSENGER NAC image
- Planet: Mercury
- Coordinates: 11.54°N 338.95°W
- Quadrangle: Derain
- Diameter: 12 km (7.5 mi)
- Eponym: Marius Petipa

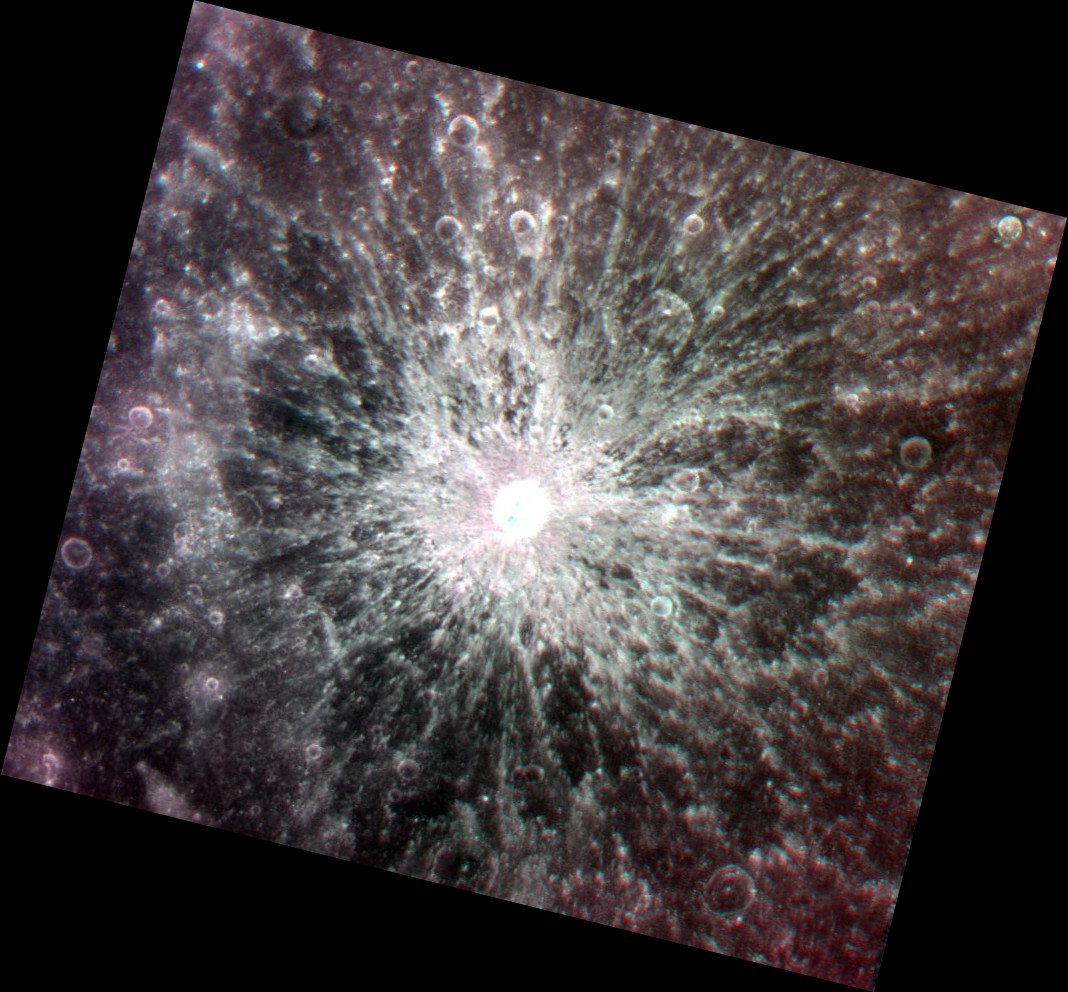
Petipa crater's ray system. Approximate color.

Petipa is a crater on Mercury. Its name was adopted by the International Astronomical Union (IAU) in 2012. It is named for the French and Russian choreographer and dancer Marius Petipa.

Petipa has an extensive ray system.

To the north of Petipa is Otaared Planitia.
