= Hokusai (crater) =

Crater on Mercury

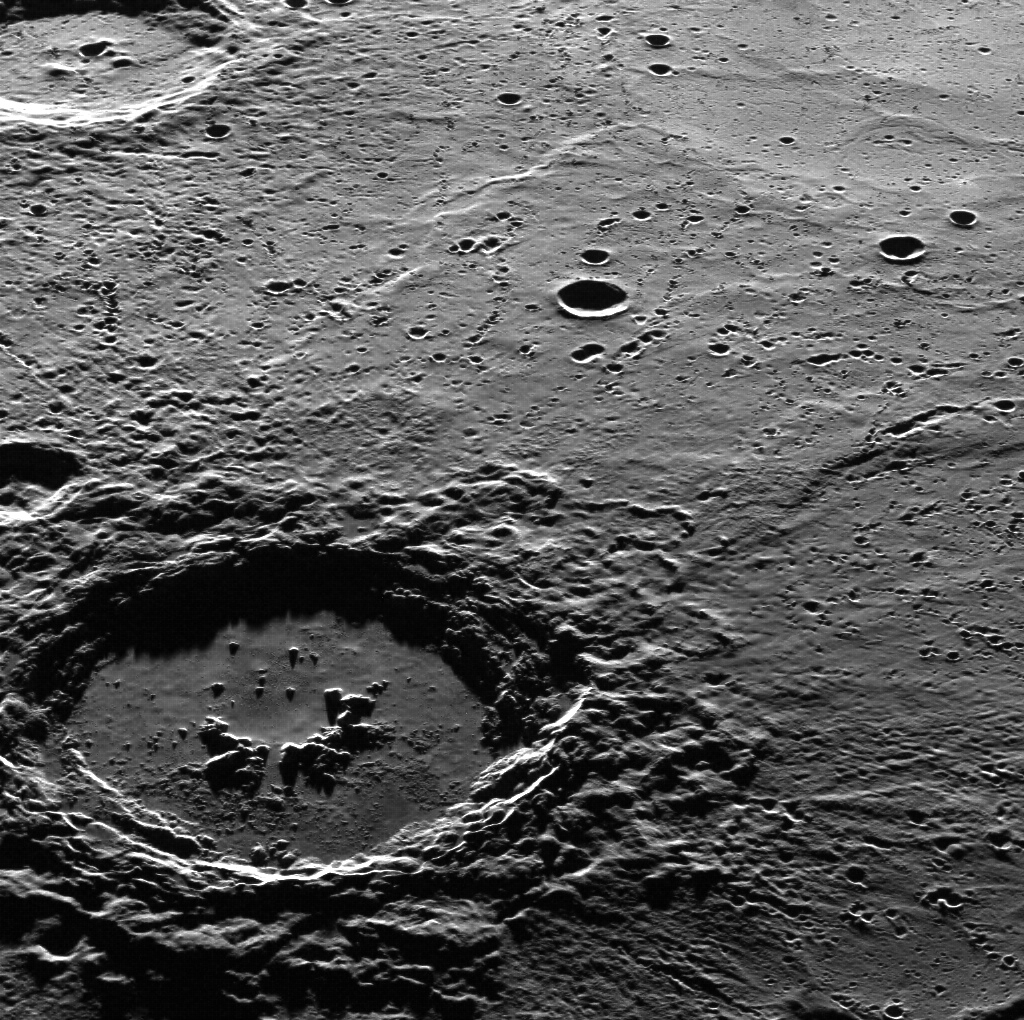
- Photo of Hokusai by MESSENGER
- Feature type: Peak-ring impact basin
- Location: Hokusai quadrangle, Mercury
- Coordinates: 58.3°N 342.3°W
- Diameter: 97 km
- Eponym: Katsushika Hokusai

Hokusai is a rayed impact crater on Mercury, which was discovered in 1991 by ground-based radar observations conducted at Goldstone Observatory. The crater was initially known as feature B. Its appearance was so dissimilar to other impact craters that it was once thought to be a shield volcano. However, improved radar images by the Arecibo Observatory obtained later in 2000–2005 clearly showed that feature B is an impact crater with an extensive ray system. The bright appearance of rays in the radio images indicates that the crater is geologically young; fresh impact ejecta has a rough surface, which leads to strong scattering of radio waves.

Hokusai is named after Katsushika Hokusai (1760–1849), a Japanese artist and printmaker of the Edo period. The name Hokusai was suggested by radar astronomer John K. Harmon. The crater has a diameter of about 100 km; the rays extend for thousands kilometers, covering much of the northern hemisphere.

== Characteristics ==
With a diameter of 97 km, Hokusai is among the largest young craters on Mercury. It is the fourth-largest crater of the Kuiperian system on Mercury. The largest is Bartók crater. Hokusai is one of 110 peak ring basins on Mercury. Its crater wall is terraced except in the northeast. The peak ring in its center is horseshoe shaped with a gap in the southwest. The floor is relatively smooth, with cracks from cooling pools impact melt. Outside the interior, a continuous ejecta blanket extends up to one crater radius from the rim. Terminal ramparts as high as 500 m surround two-thirds of the crater. These ramparts are unusual for a Mercurian crater, and they are morphologically similar to the ramparts of Martian Single-layered ejecta craters.

Hokusai has a remarkably extensive ray system for its size. Its ray system is the largest yet identified on Mercury, and some rays extend as far as 7,000 km away from the crater. Rays are asymmetrically distributed, with a greater number of them located to the southwest.

== Gallery ==
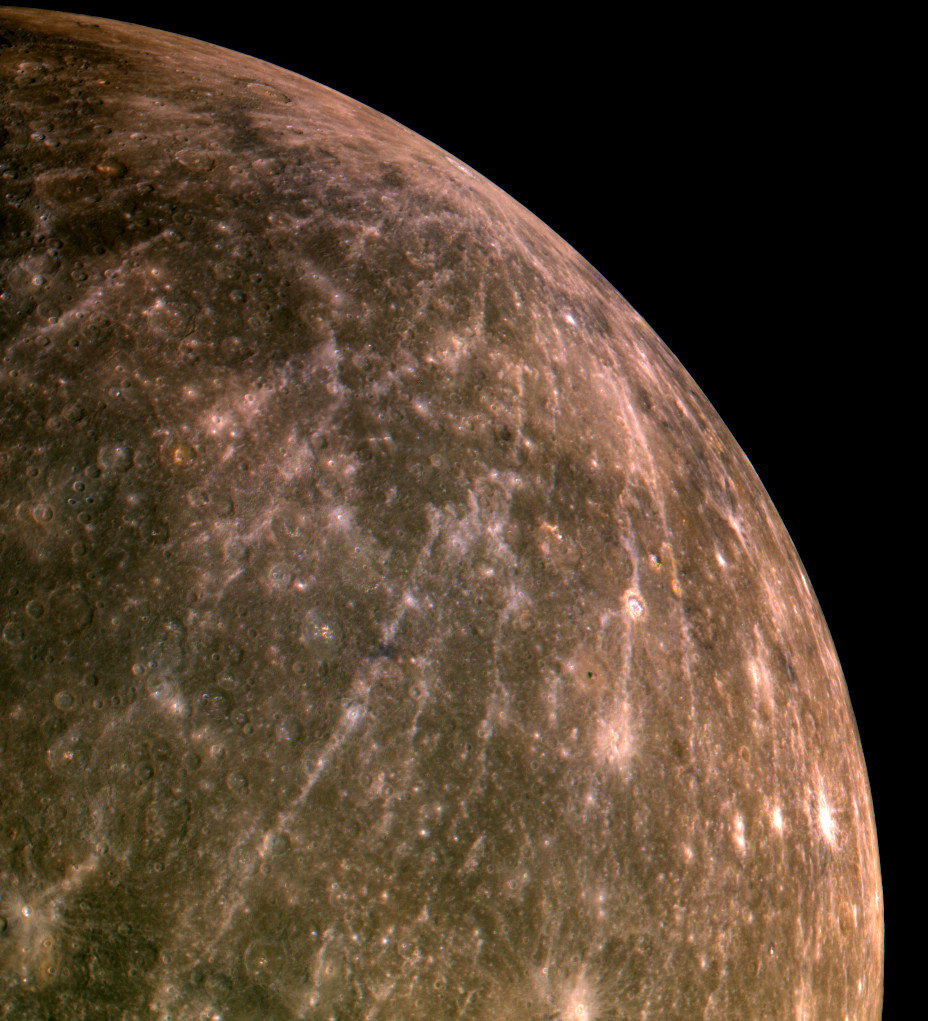
The rays of Hokusai crater (near central horizon) extend across much of the planet

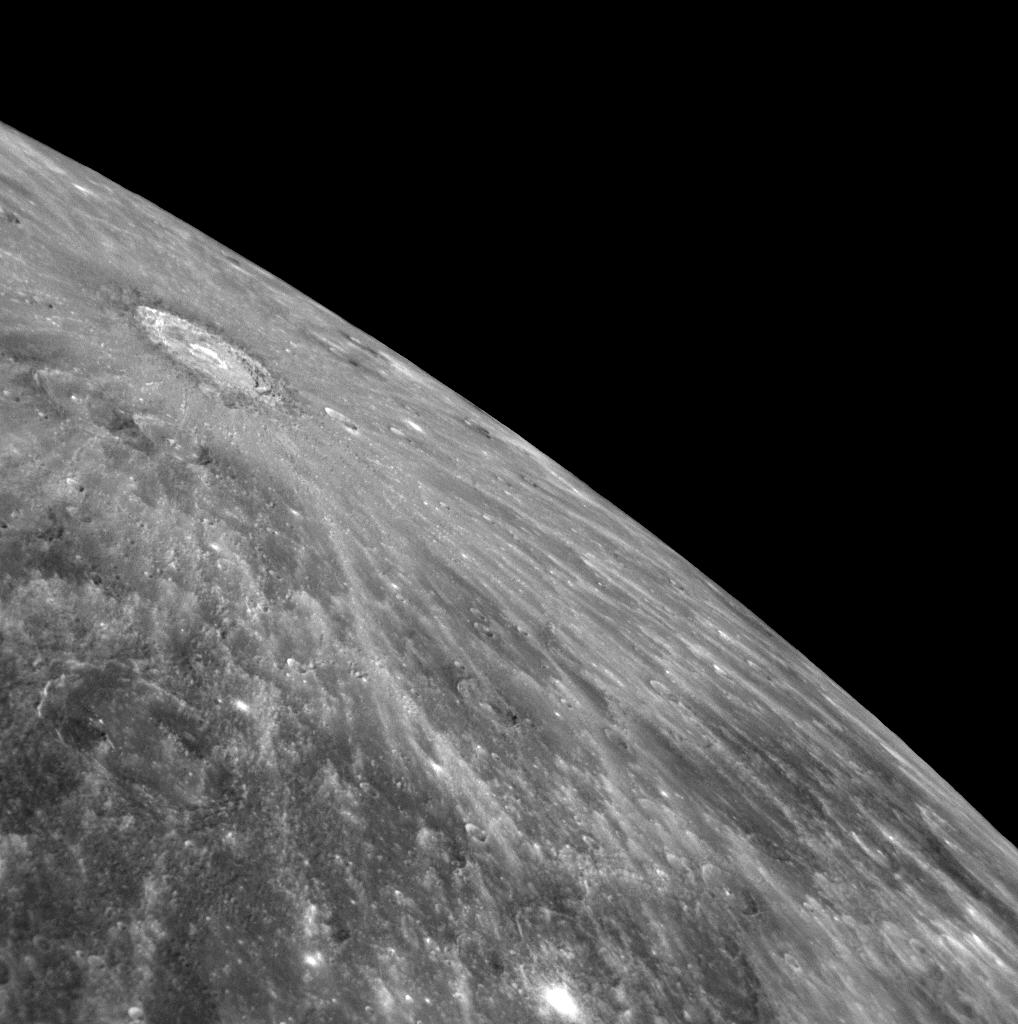
The ray system close to the crater

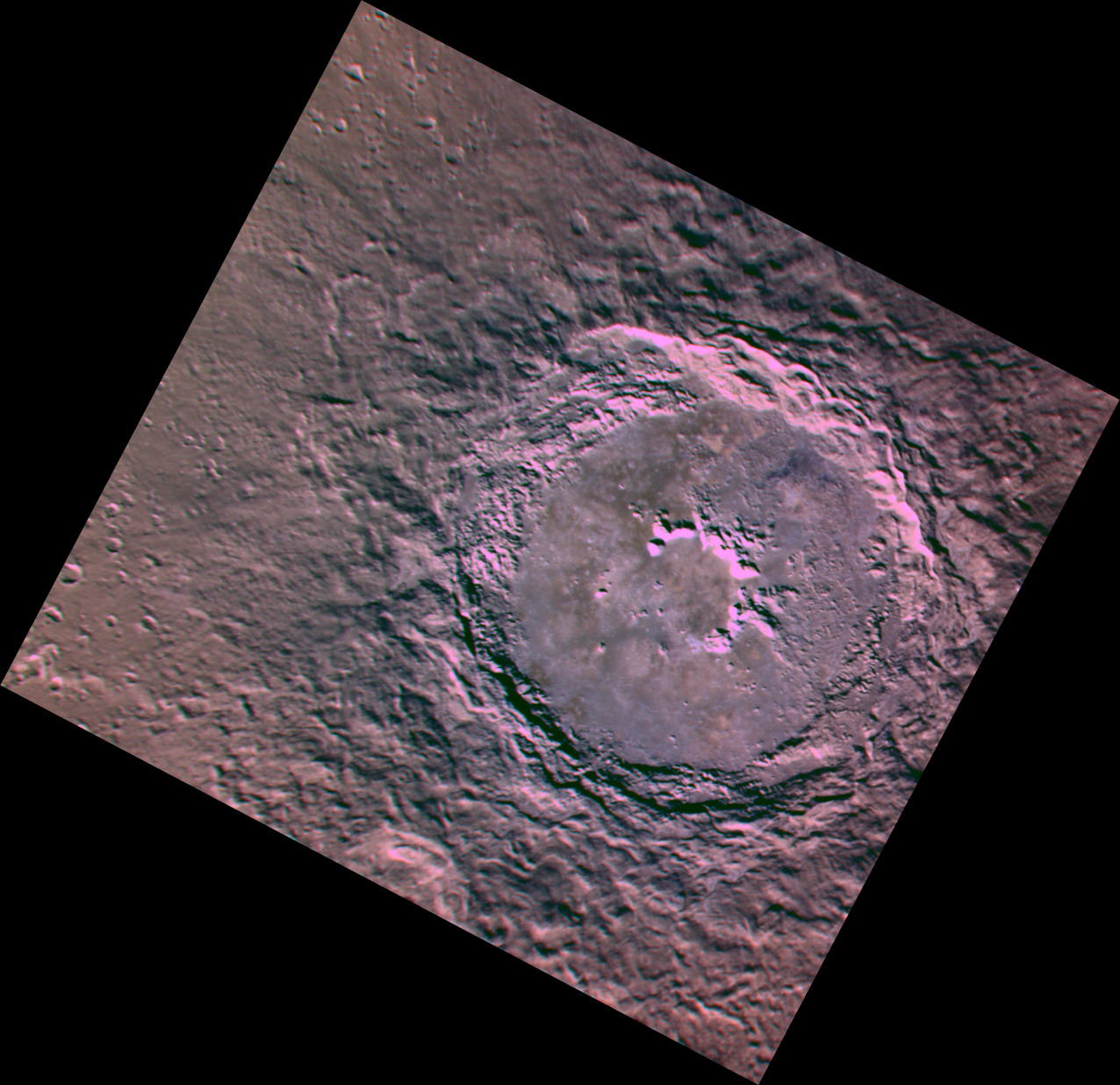
Exaggerated color image
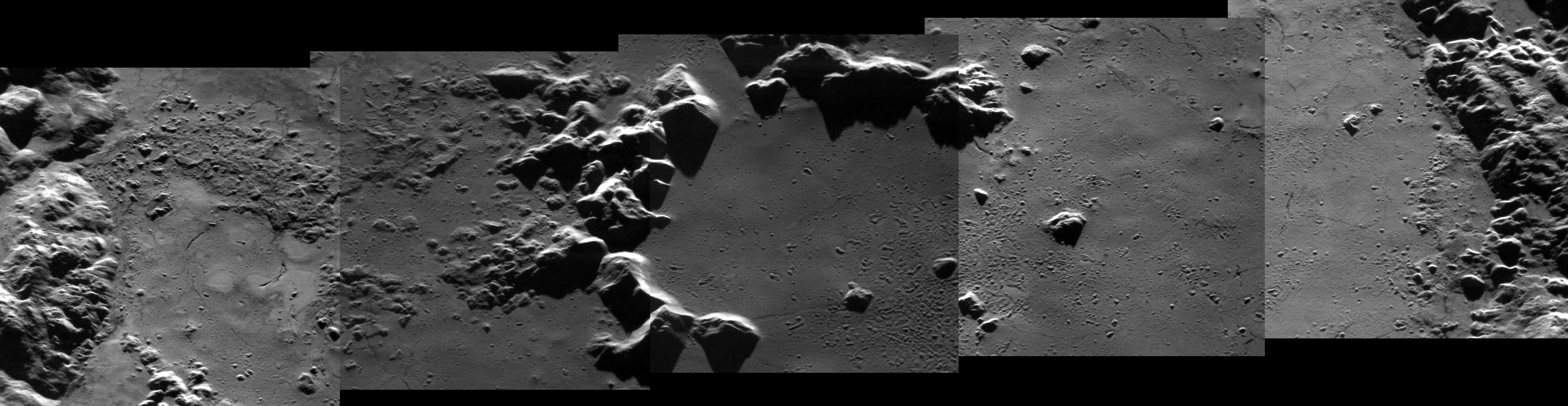
Mosaic of MESSENGER NAC images

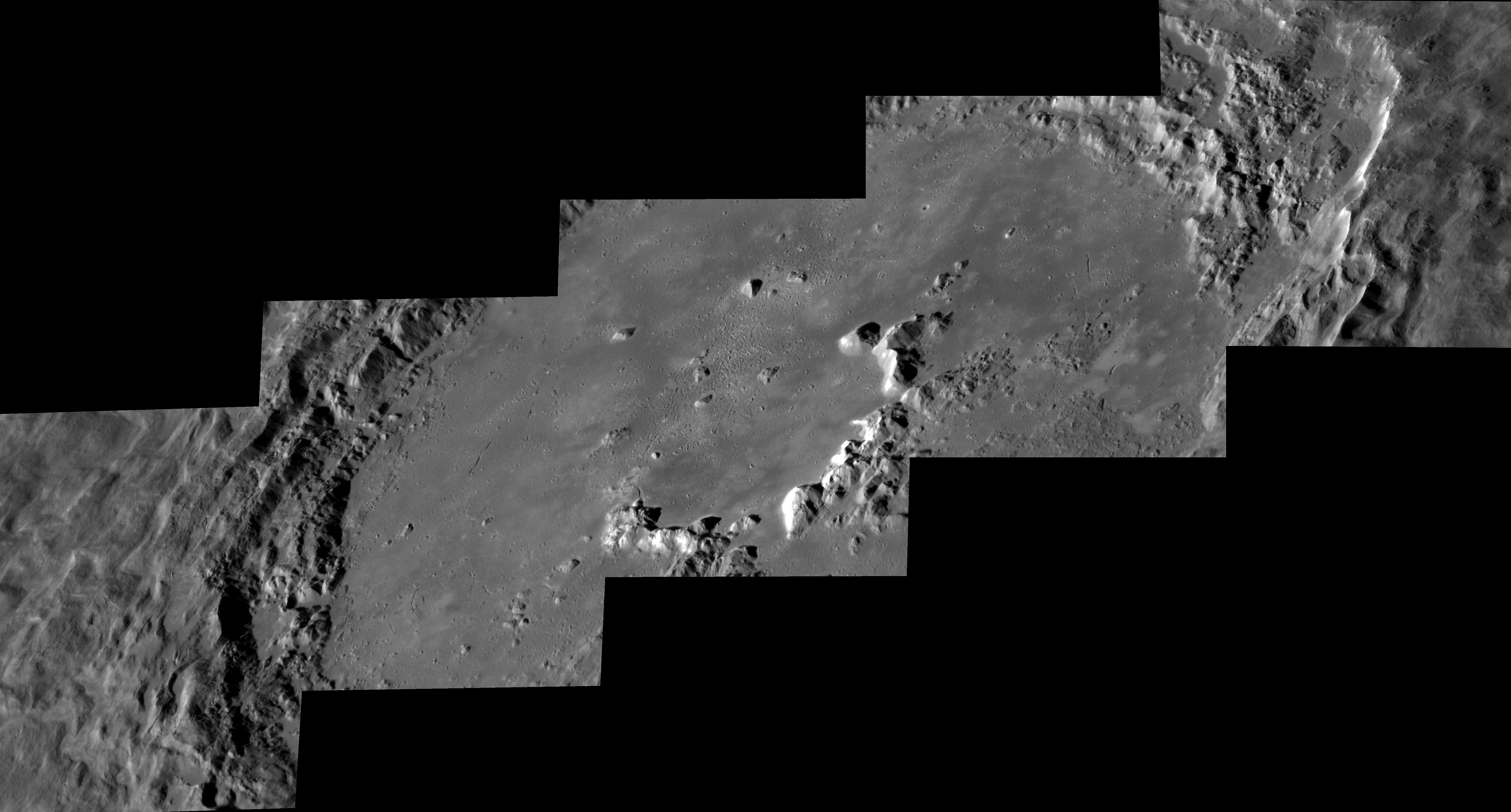
Another mosaic of the interior
