= Copland (crater) =

Crater on Mercury

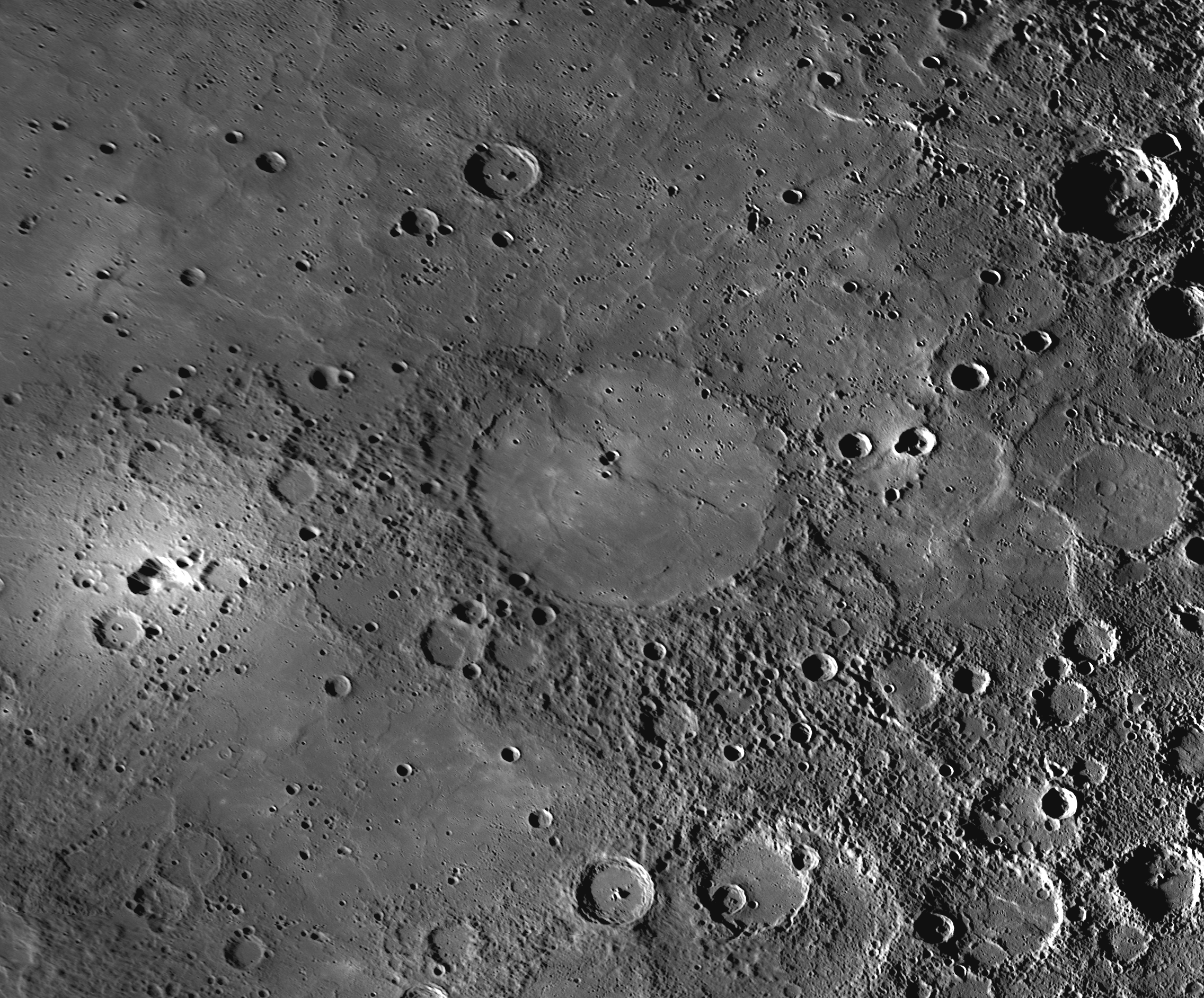
- MESSENGER WAC mosaic
- Feature type: Impact crater
- Location: Hokusai quadrangle, Mercury
- Coordinates: 37.63°N 287.01°W
- Diameter: 208 km (129 mi)
- Eponym: Aaron Copland

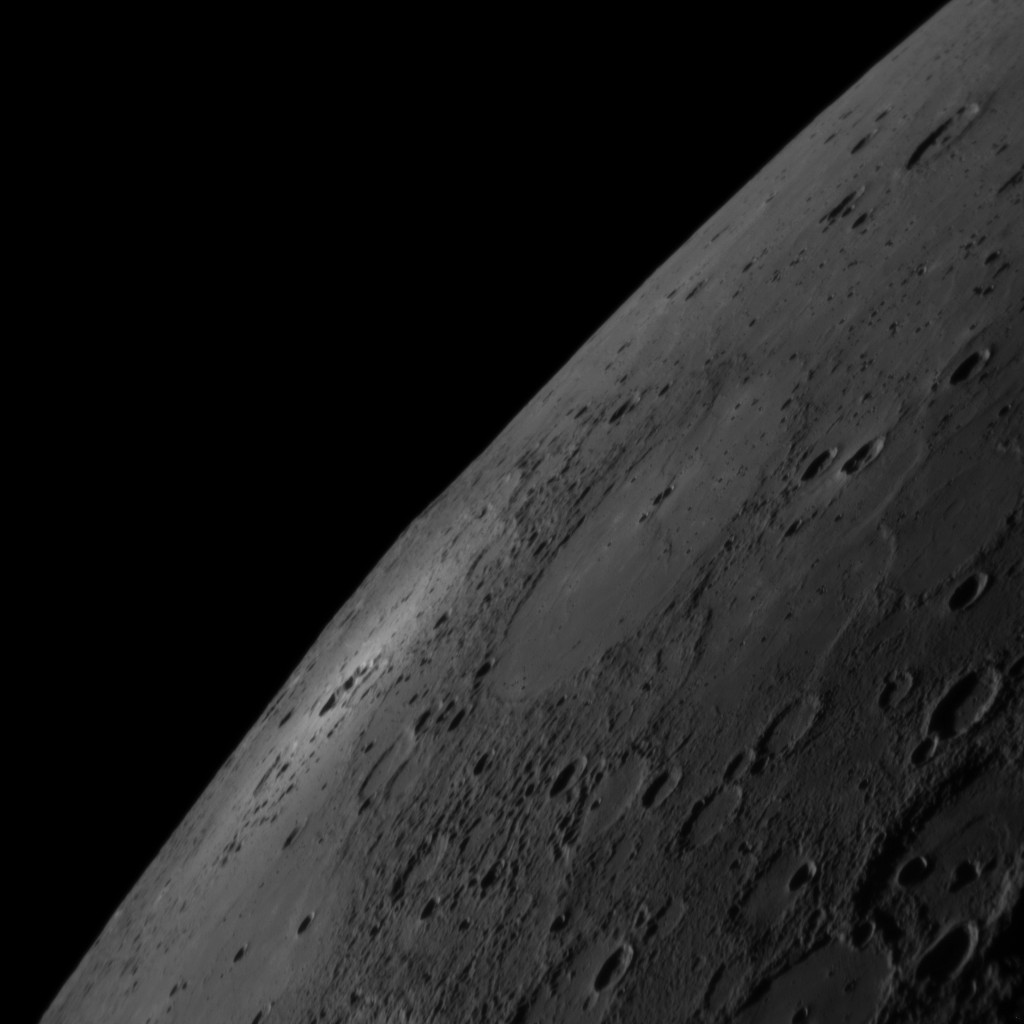
Oblique view with Copland at center, from MESSENGER's second flyby in October 2008

Copland is an impact crater on Mercury. Its floor is flooded with volcanic smooth plains material, which could be related to the activity that formed the nearby bright vent known as Nathair Facula.

== Naming ==
Amateur astronomer Ronald Dantowitz and his colleagues Scott Teare and Marek Kozubal used the Mt. Wilson 60-inch telescope in 1998 to observe a very bright feature on this portion of Mercury's surface, and they assumed that the bright feature was an impact crater. Mr. Dantowitz expressed his wish that the crater be named "Copland" (after American composer Aaron Copland) once better images of the area were obtained from spacecraft.

Surprisingly, MESSENGER images from Mercury flyby 3 revealed that the small bright feature, seen at the left edge of this image and now known as Nathair Facula, is not an impact crater but more closely resembles a volcanic vent. No convention for naming volcanic vents on Mercury had yet been adopted, because none were identified prior to MESSENGER's first Mercury flyby. A MESSENGER team member corresponded with Mr. Dantowitz and suggested that the name Copland be proposed instead for a large crater nearby. He agreed, and the International Astronomical Union (IAU) approved the name Copland on March 3, 2010.
