= Nathair Facula =

Facula on Mercury

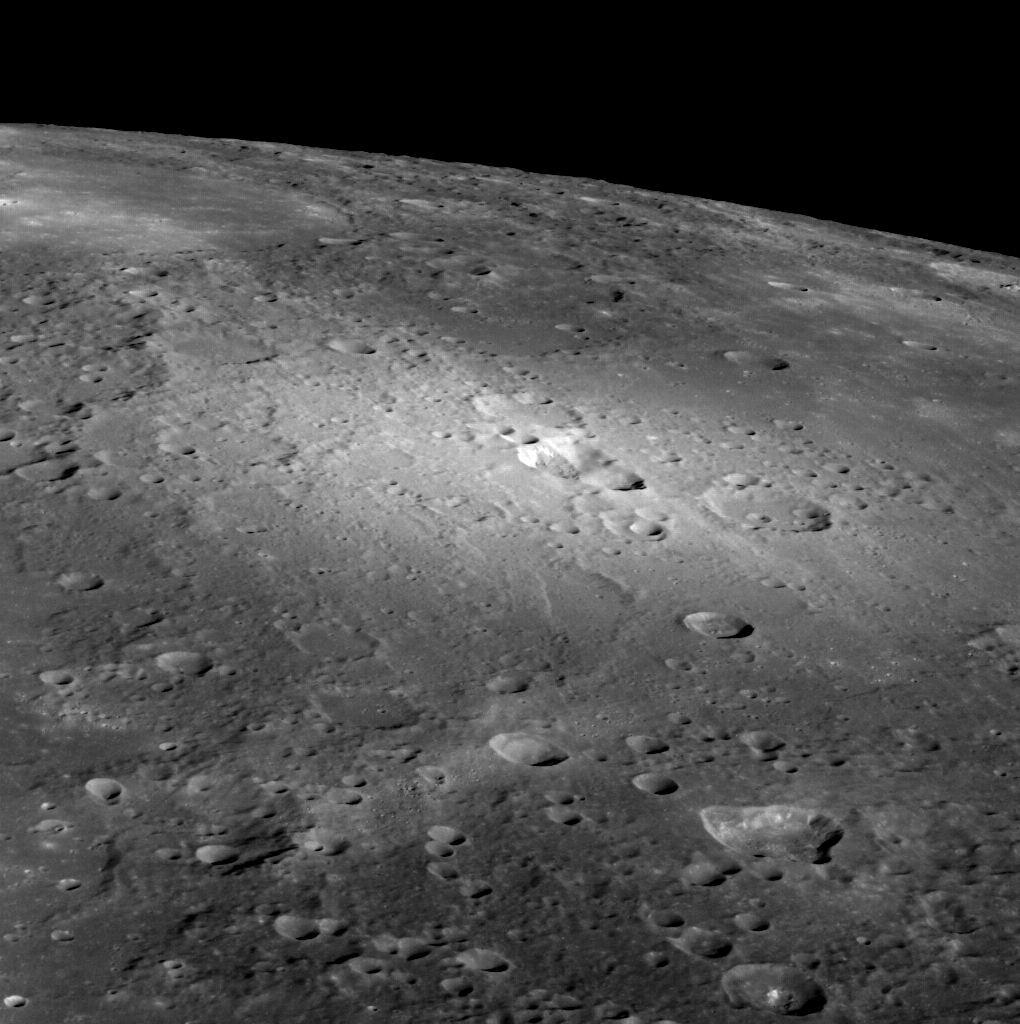
Oblique MESSENGER image of Nathair Facula

Nathair Facula is a bright region on the surface of Mercury, located at 36° N, 295.5° W. It was named by the IAU in 2018. Nathair is the Irish and Scottish Gaelic word for snake.

In the center of the region is an irregular depression with crisp topography, surrounded by a region of subdued features. It is interpreted to be the site of explosive volcanic eruptions. Hollows have formed within the depression. The facula is approximately 270 km wide, although the edges are diffuse.

Nathair Facula is located in the Hokusai quadrangle, northeast of the prominent Rachmaninoff crater, west of Copland crater, and east of the smaller Neidr Facula.

== Views ==
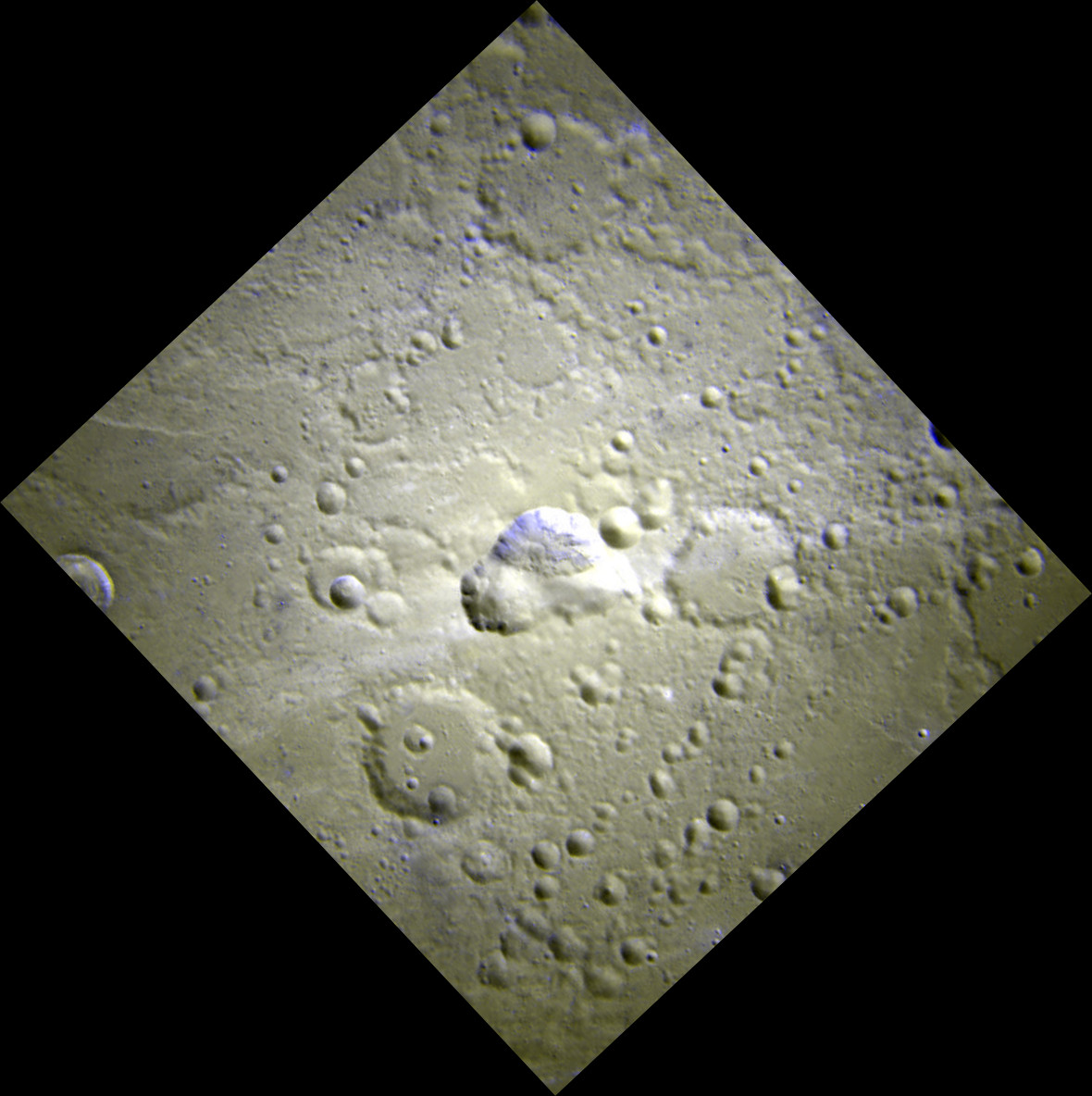
Approximate color image

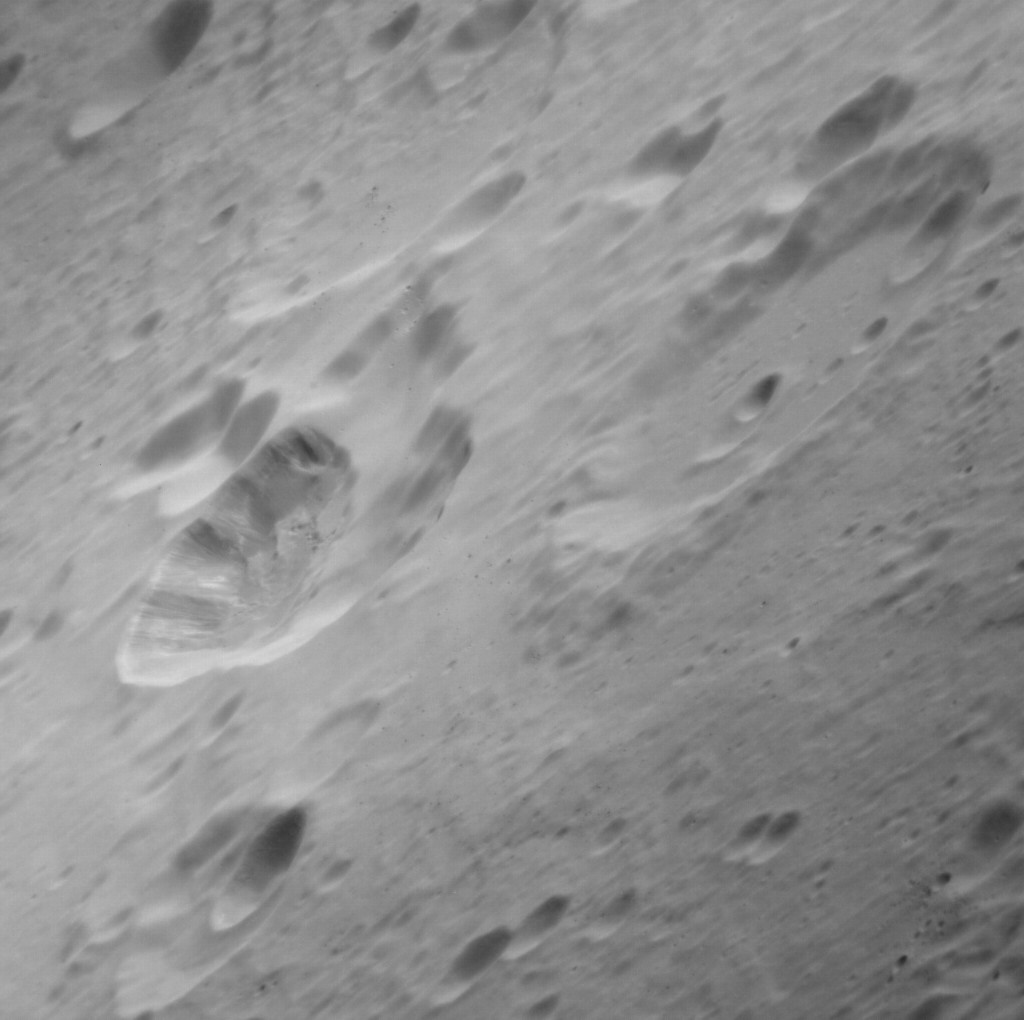
Oblique view

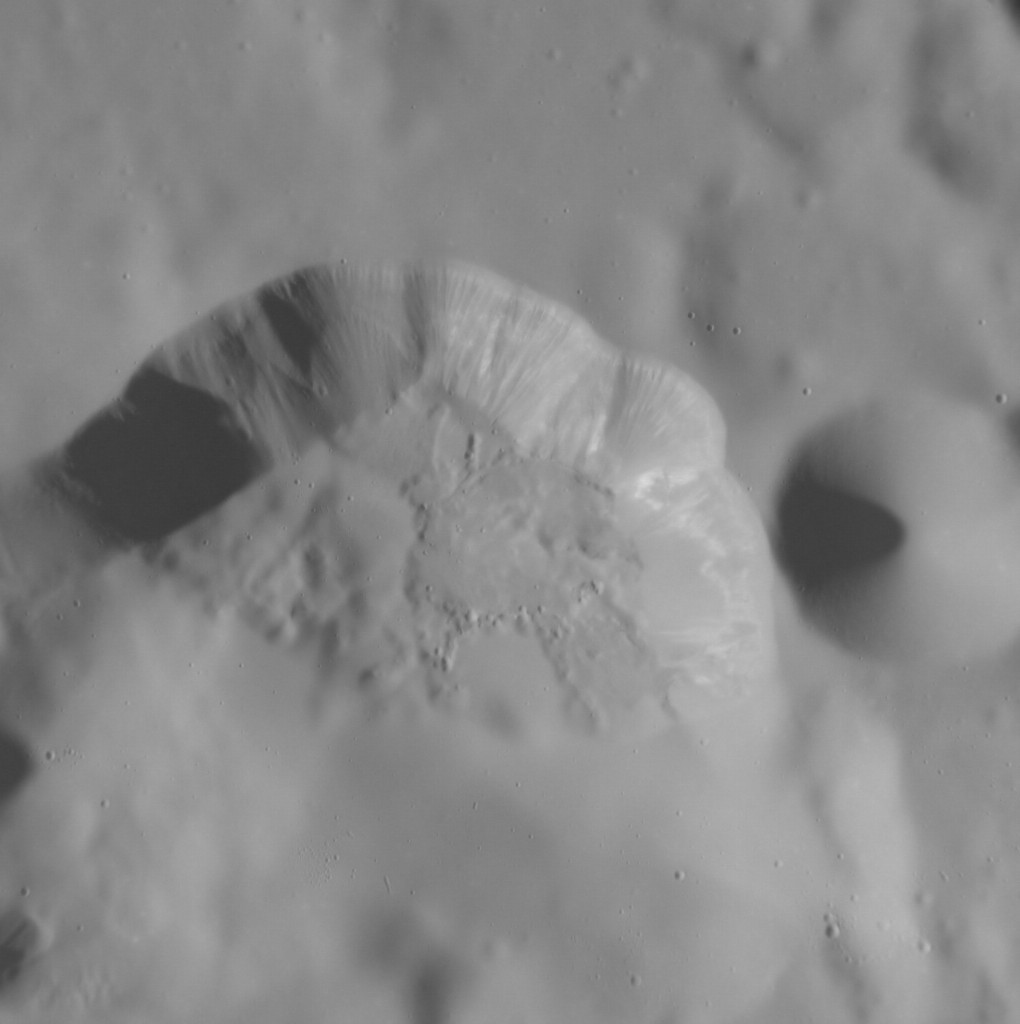
Closeup of center of Nathair Facula

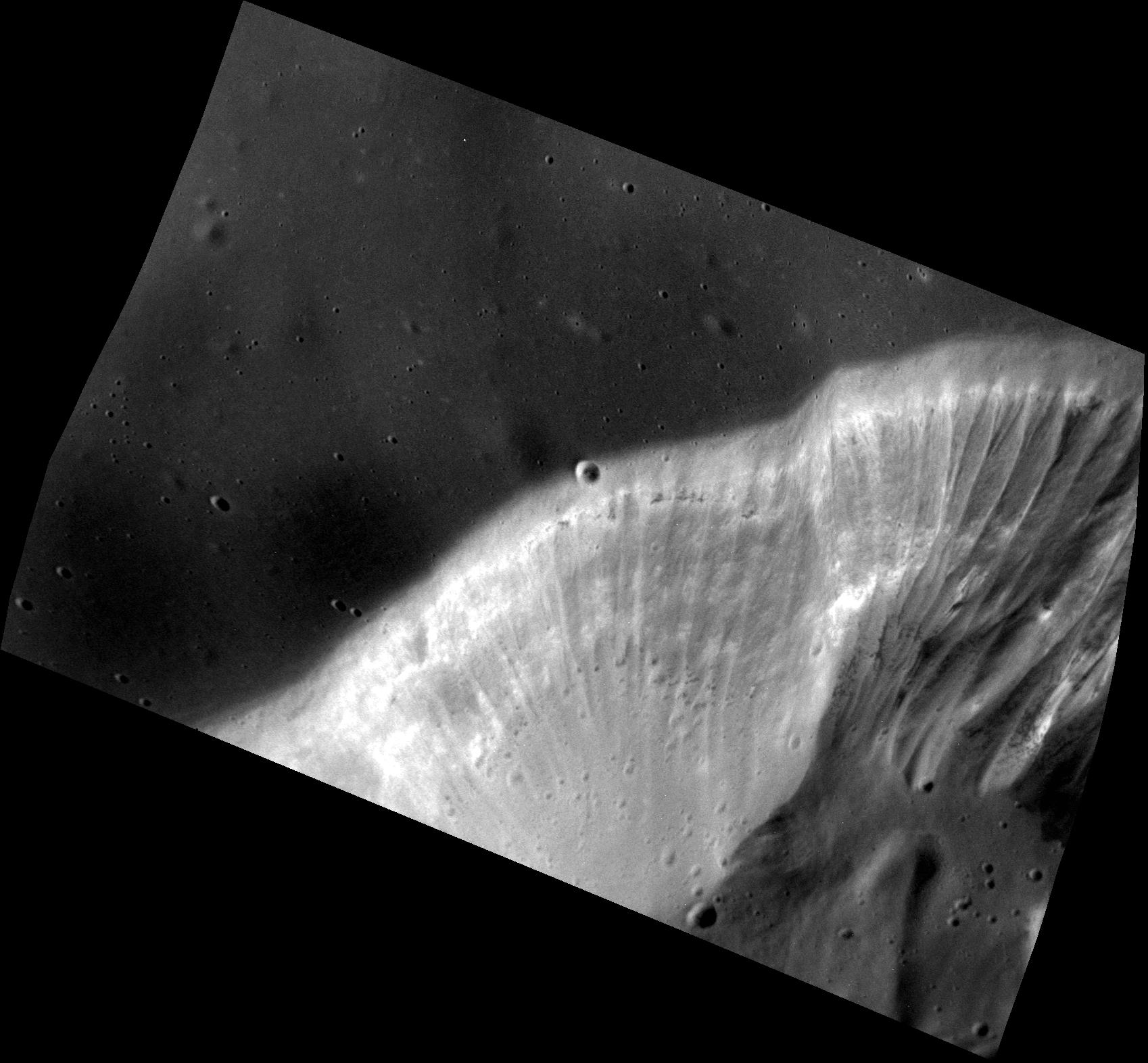
Very high-resolution image of the northern rim, showing gullies and evidence of the formation of hollows
