= Neidr Facula =

Irregular depression on the surface of Mercury

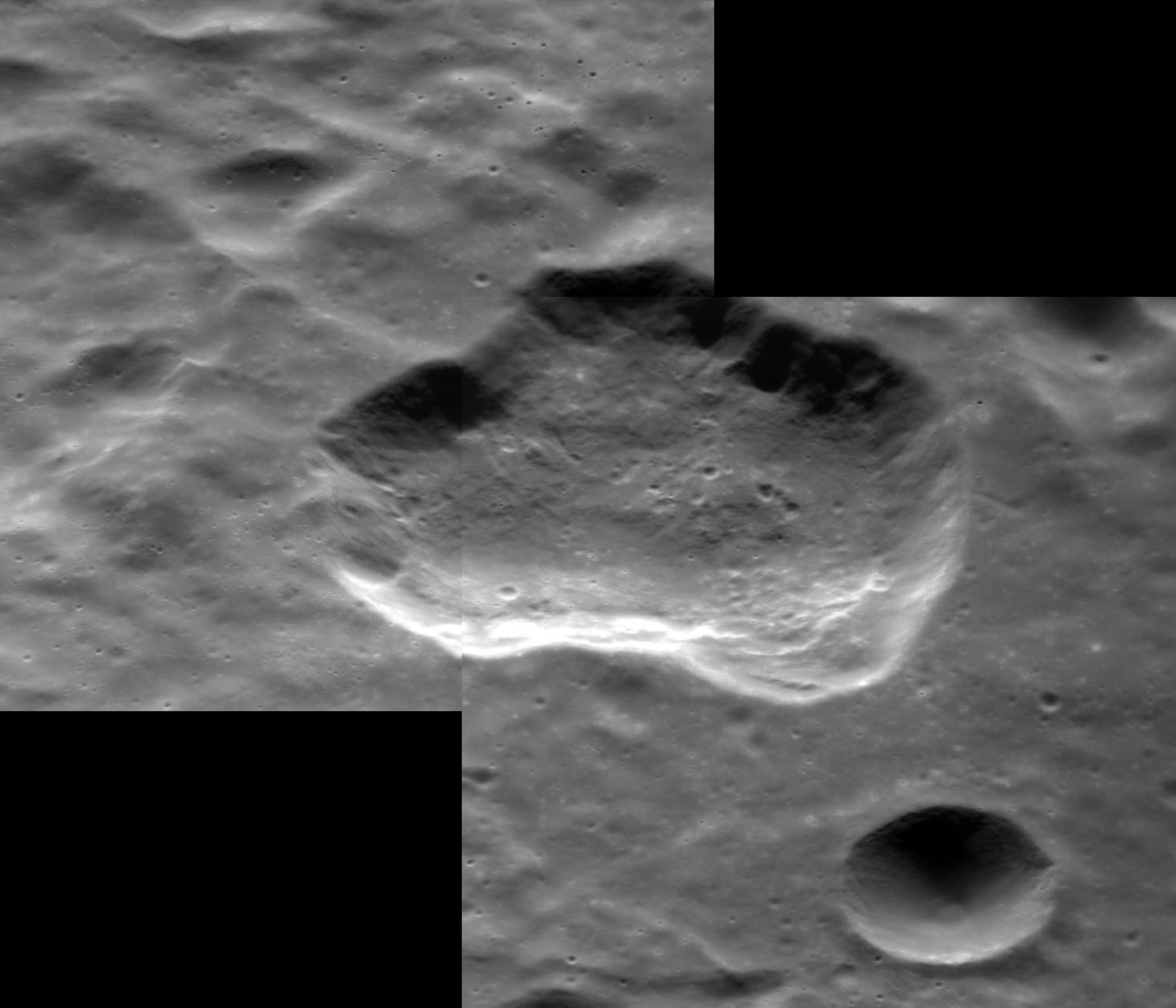
Oblique view of Neidr Facula by MESSENGER

Neidr Facula is a bright, irregular depression on the surface of Mercury, located at 35.9° N, 302.7° W. It was named by the IAU in 2018. Neidr is the Welsh word for snake.

Neidr Facula is believed to be a large volcanic vent.

Neidr Facula is located north of the prominent Rachmaninoff crater and west of the bright Nathair Facula.
