= Calder (crater) =

Crater on Mercury

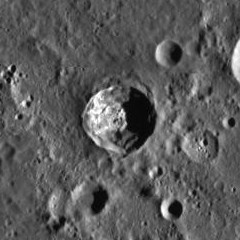
- MESSENGER WAC mosaic of Calder
- Feature type: Impact crater
- Location: Derain quadrangle, Mercury
- Coordinates: 3.51°N 347.25°W
- Diameter: 24 km (15 mi)
- Eponym: Alexander Calder

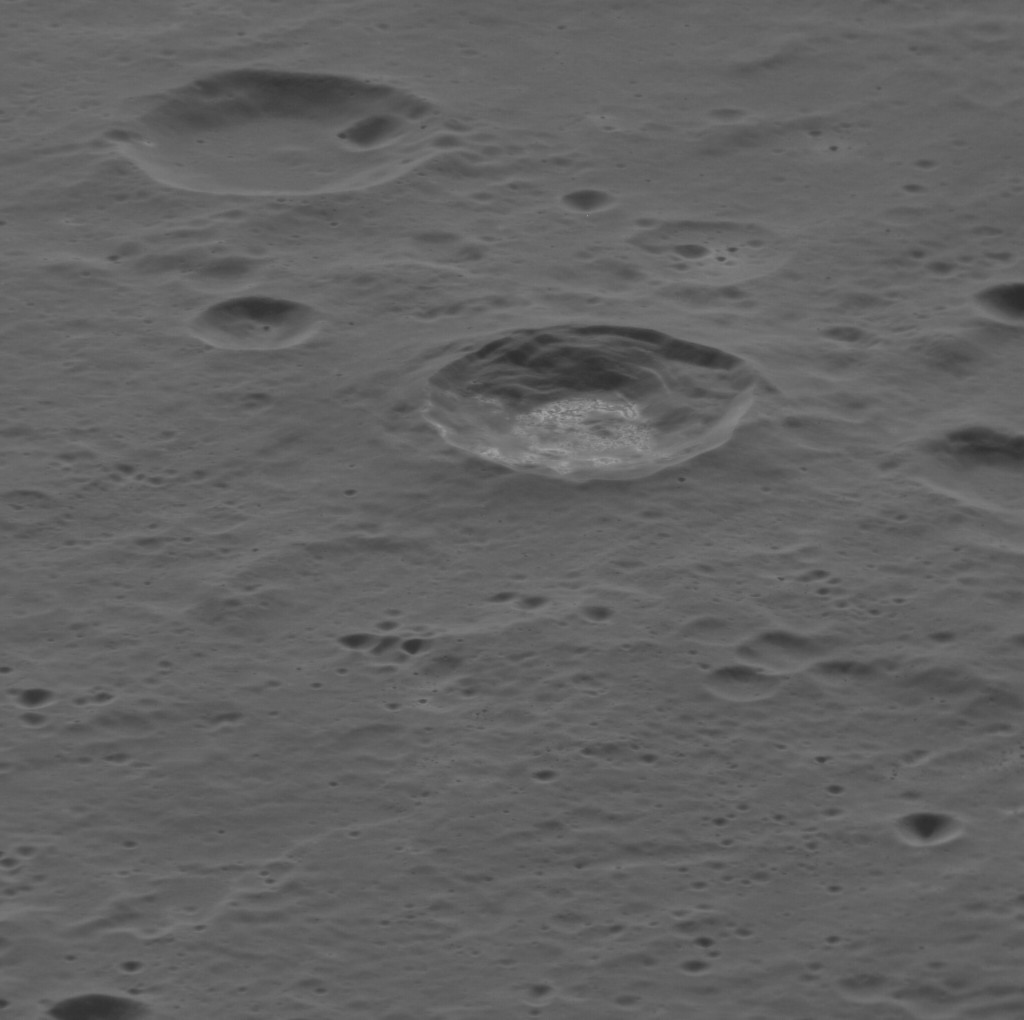
Oblique view by MESSENGER NAC

Calder is a small crater on Mercury. Its name was adopted by the International Astronomical Union (IAU) in 2013. Calder is named for the American sculptor Alexander Calder.

Hollows are visible on the floor of Calder.

Villa-Lobos is to the northwest of Calder.
