= Hodgkins (crater) =

Crater on Mercury

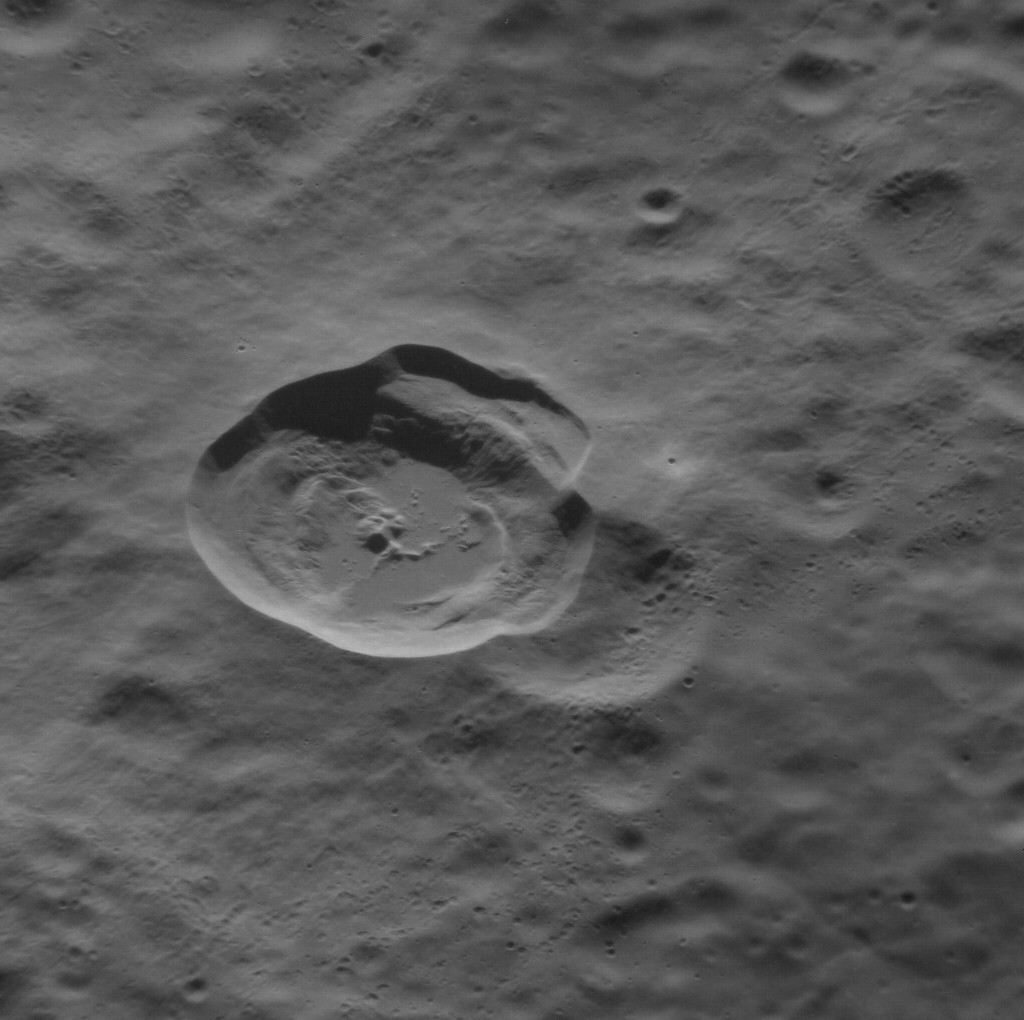
- Oblique MESSENGER NAC image of Hodgkins
- Feature type: Impact crater
- Location: Hokusai quadrangle, Mercury
- Coordinates: 29.2°N 341.74°W
- Diameter: 19 km (12 mi)
- Eponym: Frances Hodgkins

Hodgkins is a crater on Mercury. It has a diameter of 19 kilometers. Its name was adopted by the International Astronomical Union in 2009. Hodgkins is named for the New Zealand painter Frances Hodgkins, who lived from 1869 to 1947.

Hodgkins crater possesses a ray system and is thus a relatively recent impact.

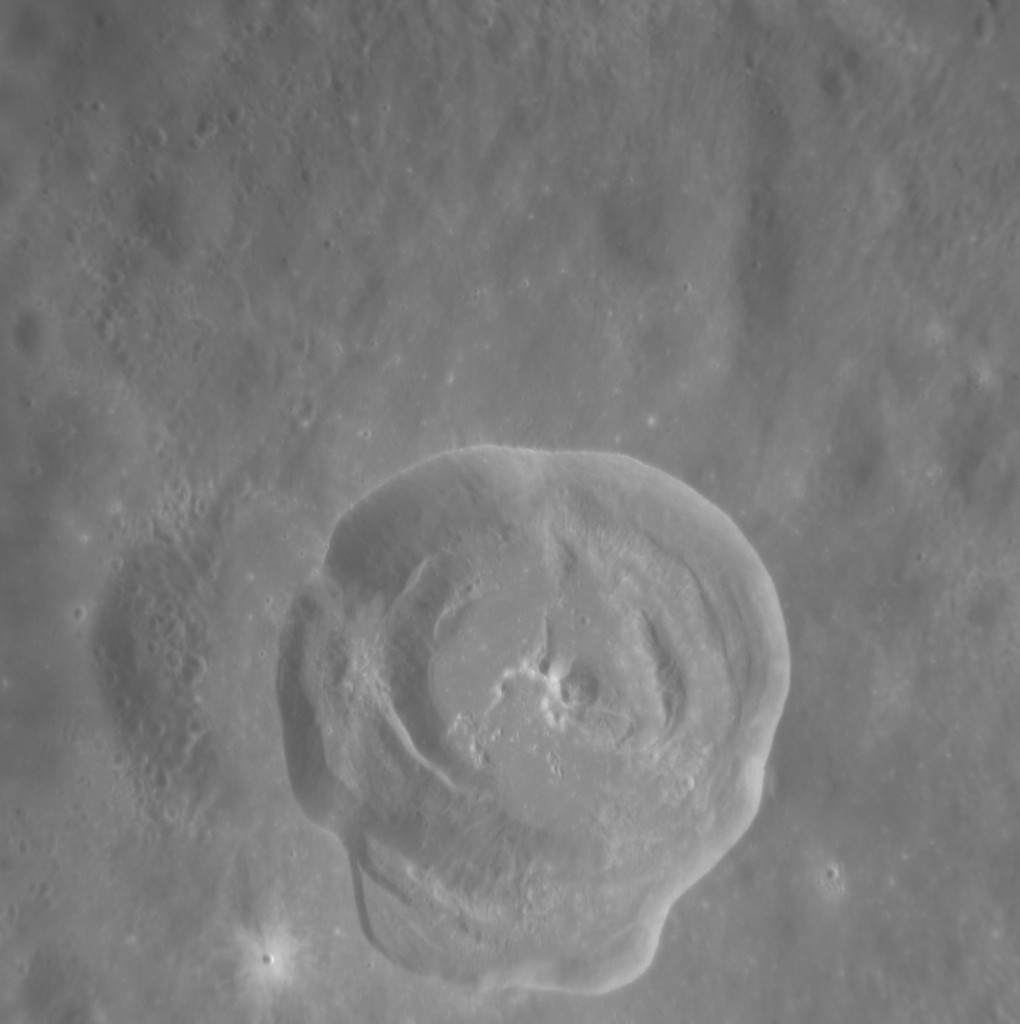
Another MESSENGER NAC image

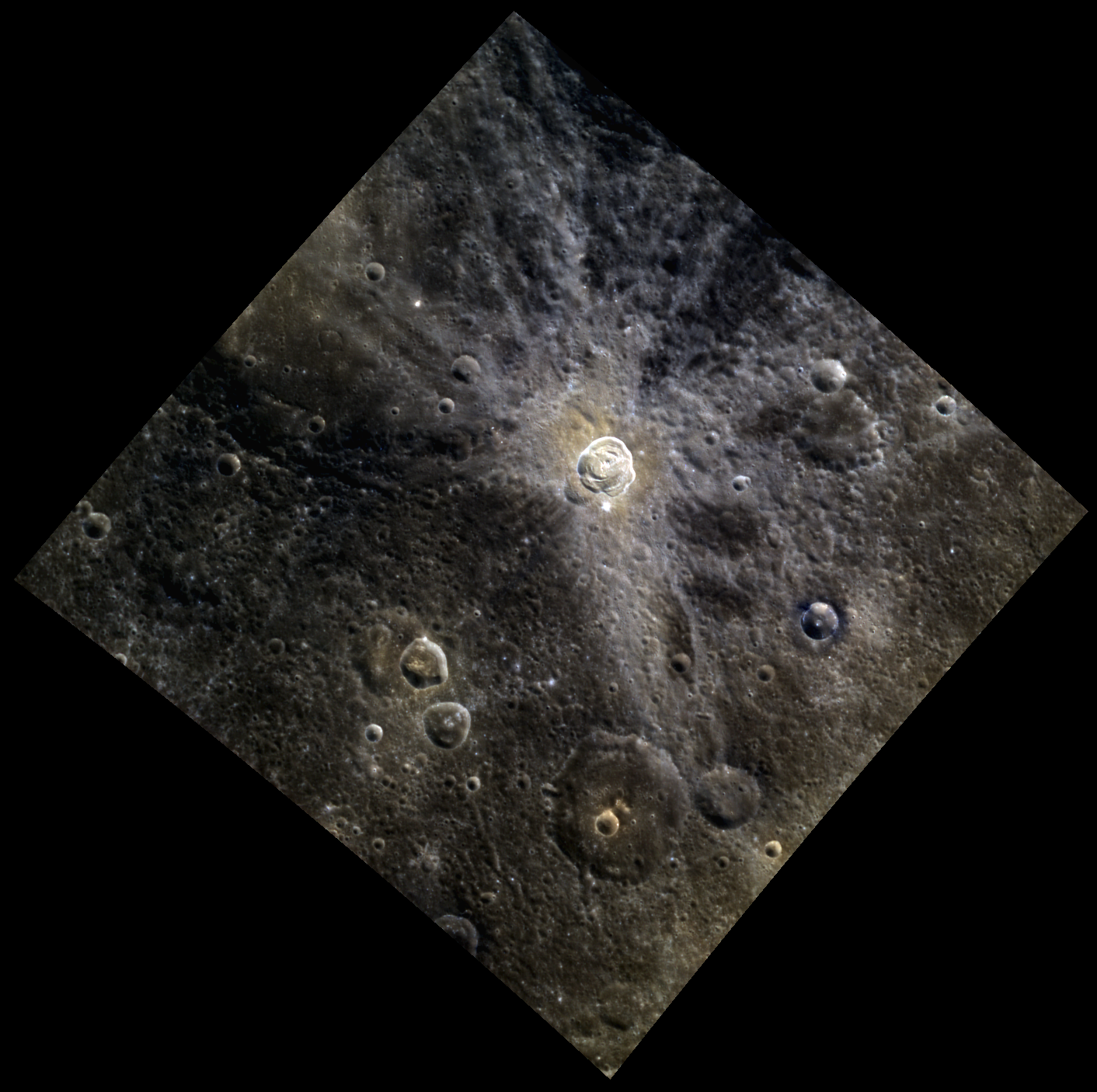
Hodgkins crater in color, showing the ray system
