= Hokusai quadrangle =

Quadrangle on Mercury

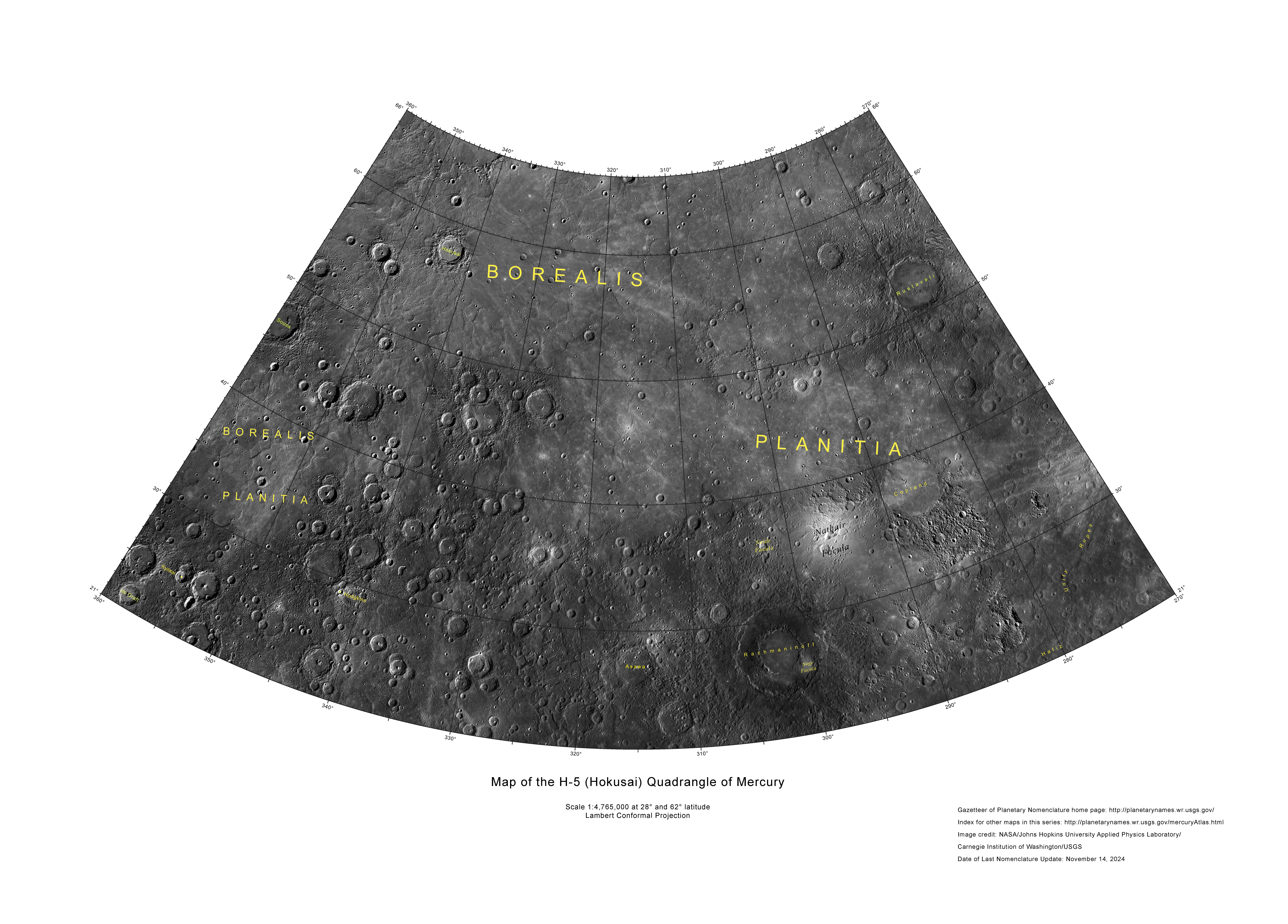
Hokusai quadrangle as mapped by the MESSENGER spacecraft

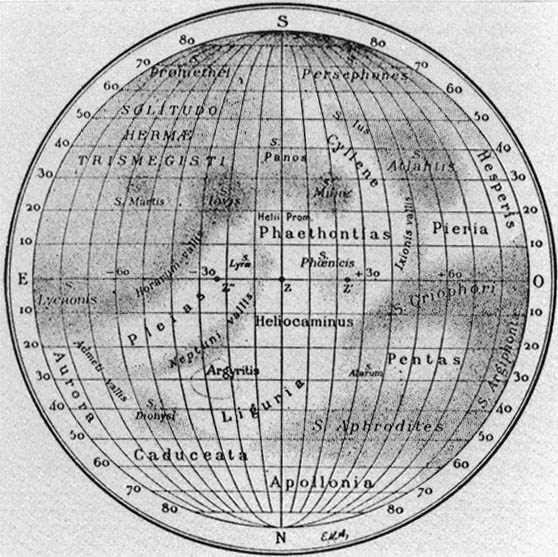
1934 map showing the Apollonia albedo feature

The Hokusai quadrangle (H-5) is one of fifteen quadrangles on the planet Mercury. It runs from 360 to 270° longitude and 20 to 70° latitude. Named after the Hokusai crater, it was mapped in detail for the first time after MESSENGER entered orbit around Mercury in 2011. It had not been mapped prior to that point because it was one of the six quadrangles that was not illuminated when Mariner 10 made its flybys in 1974 and 1975. These six quadrangles continued to be known by their albedo feature names, with this one known as the Apollonia quadrangle.

Prominent features within Hokusai quadrangle, other than Hokusai itself, include the large peak ring crater Rachmaninoff and the somewhat smaller crater Rustaveli. Two faculae, or bright areas, are north of Rachmaninoff. One is the prominent Nathair Facula and the other is the subdued Neidr Facula. These are thought to be volcanic vents. A similar (unnamed) feature without bright coloration is northeast of the crater Hodgkins, informally named the butterfly vent. Much of the quadrangle is covered by the smooth plains of the Borealis Planitia.

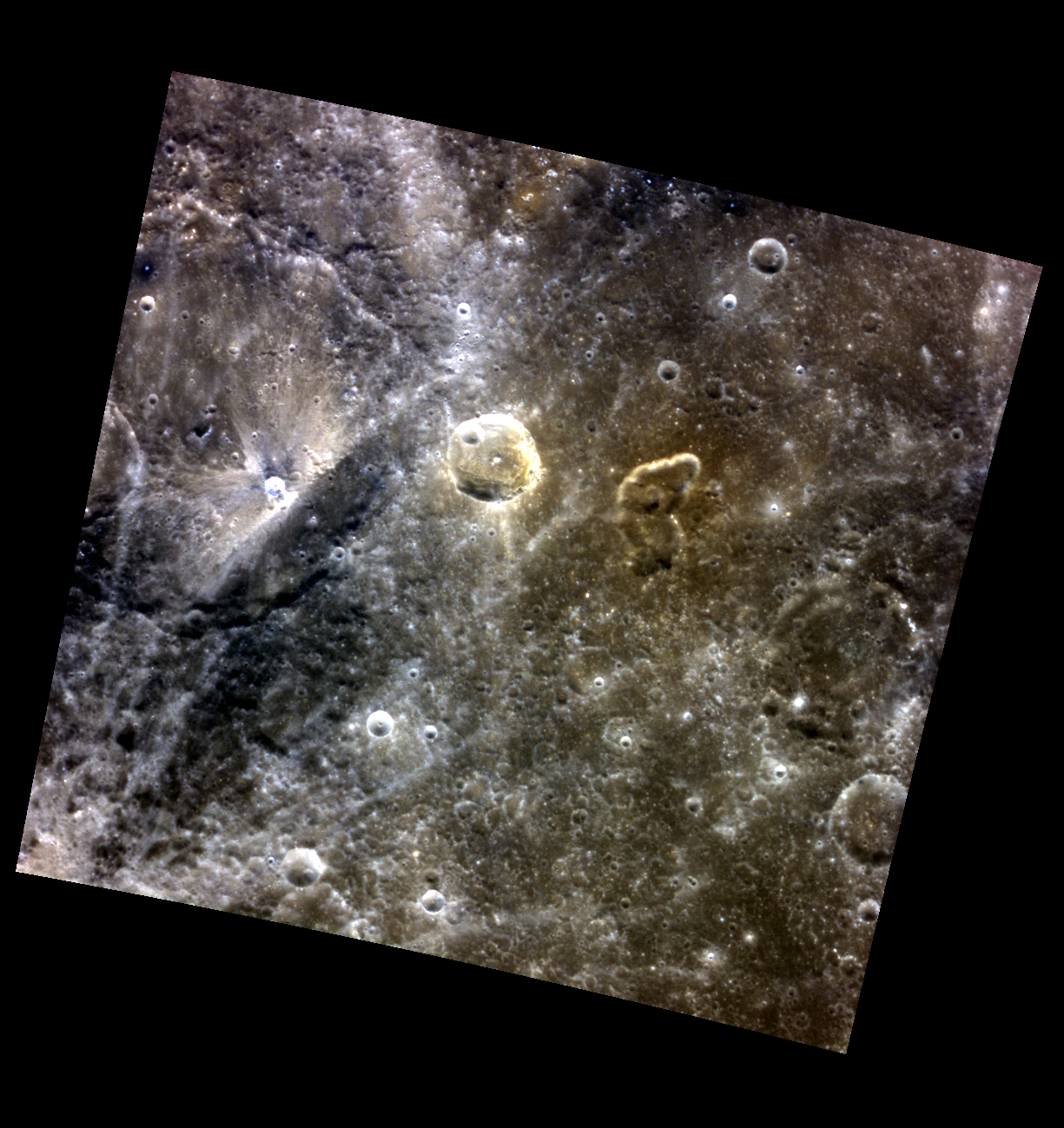
The butterfly vent is right of center.

The Borealis quadrangle is north of Hokusai quadrangle. To the west is Victoria quadrangle, and to the east is Raditladi quadrangle. To the south is Derain quadrangle, and to the southeast is Eminescu quadrangle.

== Geological history ==
H-1 Borealis (features)
| H-5 Hokusai (features) | H-4 Raditladi (features) | H-3 Shakespeare (features) | | H-2 Victoria (features) |
| H-10 Derain (features) | H-9 Eminescu (features) | H-8 Tolstoj (features) | H-7 Beethoven (features) | H-6 Kuiper (features) |
| H-14 Debussy (features) | H-13 Neruda (features) | H-12 Michelangelo (features) | | H-11 Discovery (features) |
H-15 Bach (features)
