= Zeami (crater) =

Crater on Mercury

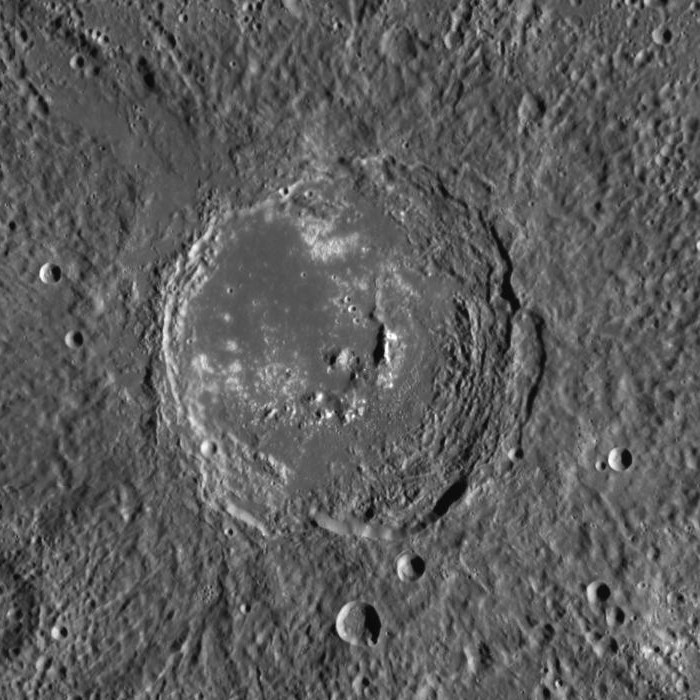
- MESSENGER WAC mosaic
- Planet: Mercury
- Coordinates: 2.96°S 147.41°W
- Quadrangle: Tolstoj
- Diameter: 129 km (80 mi)
- Eponym: Zeami Motokiyo

Zeami is a crater on Mercury. Its name was adopted by the International Astronomical Union in 1976, after the Japanese dramatist and playwright Zeami Motokiyo.

Hollows are present within Zeami. Small irregular depressions near the central peak complex are evidence of explosive volcanism on the floor of the crater.

The crater Stevenson is to the northeast of Zeami. Sophocles is to the south, and Goya is to the southwest.

== Views ==
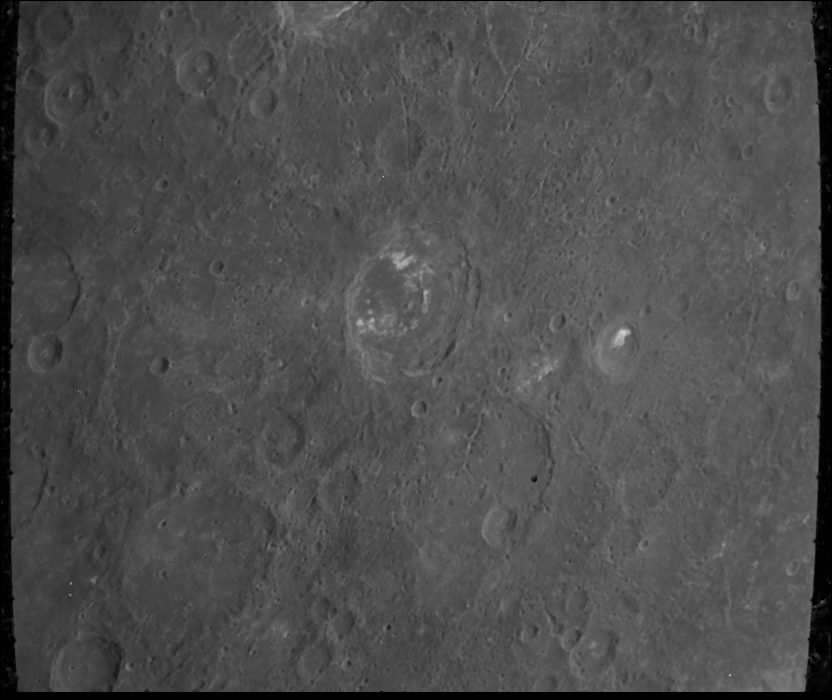
Mariner 10 image with Zeami at center

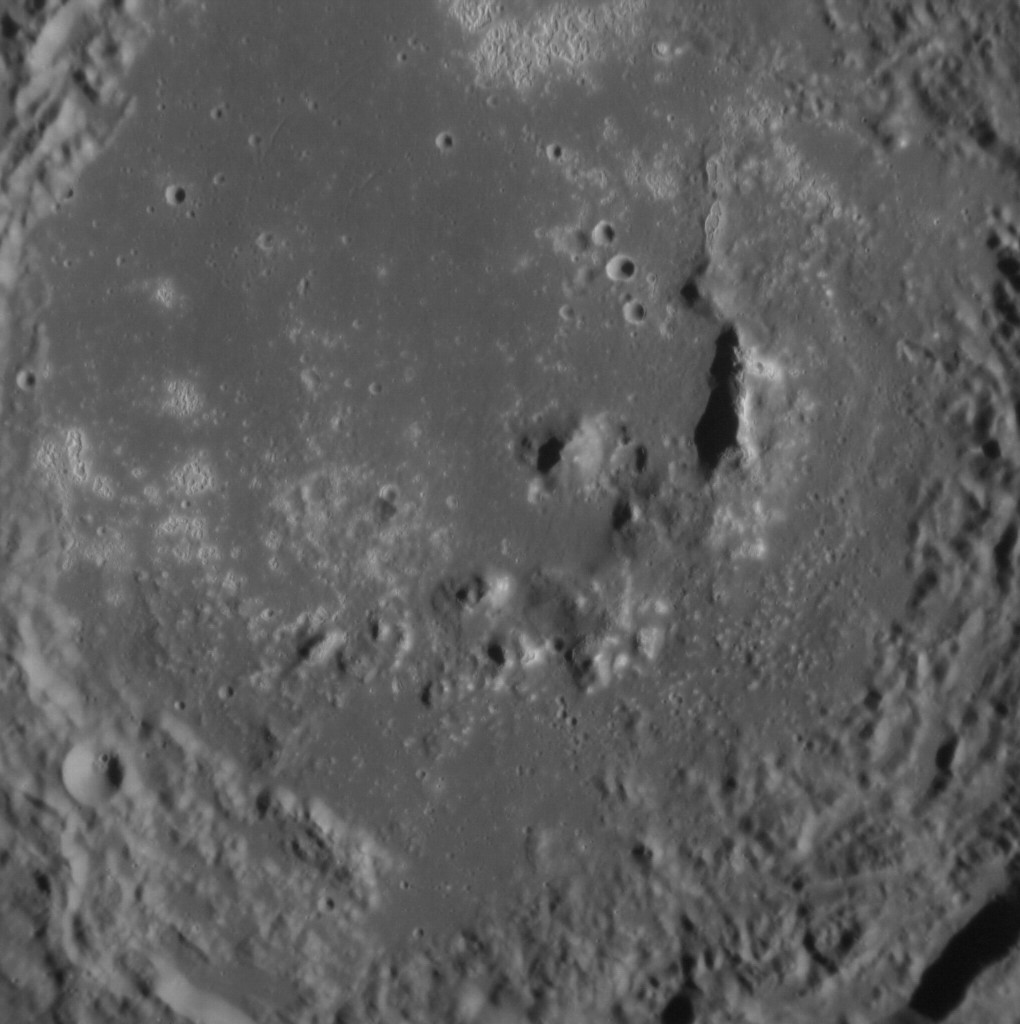
Zeami crater interior

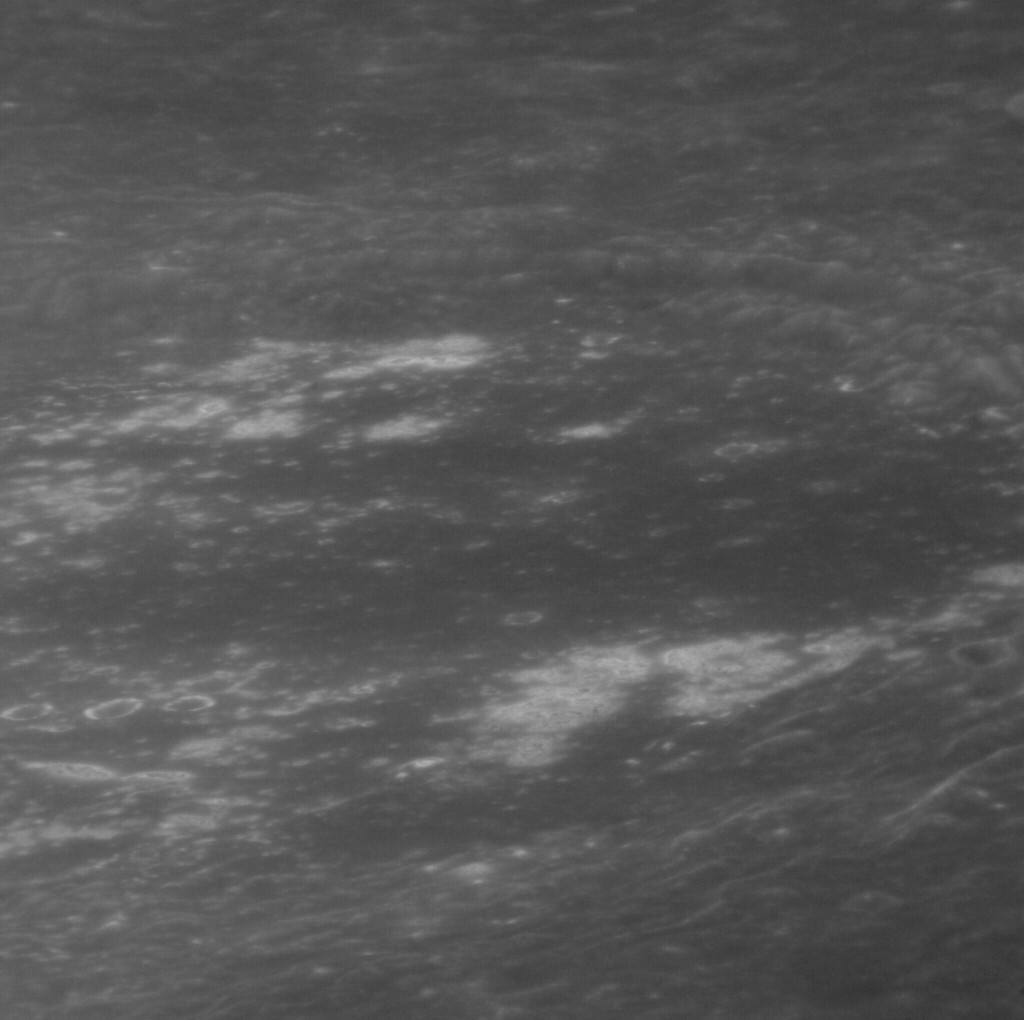
Oblique view across northern Zeami crater

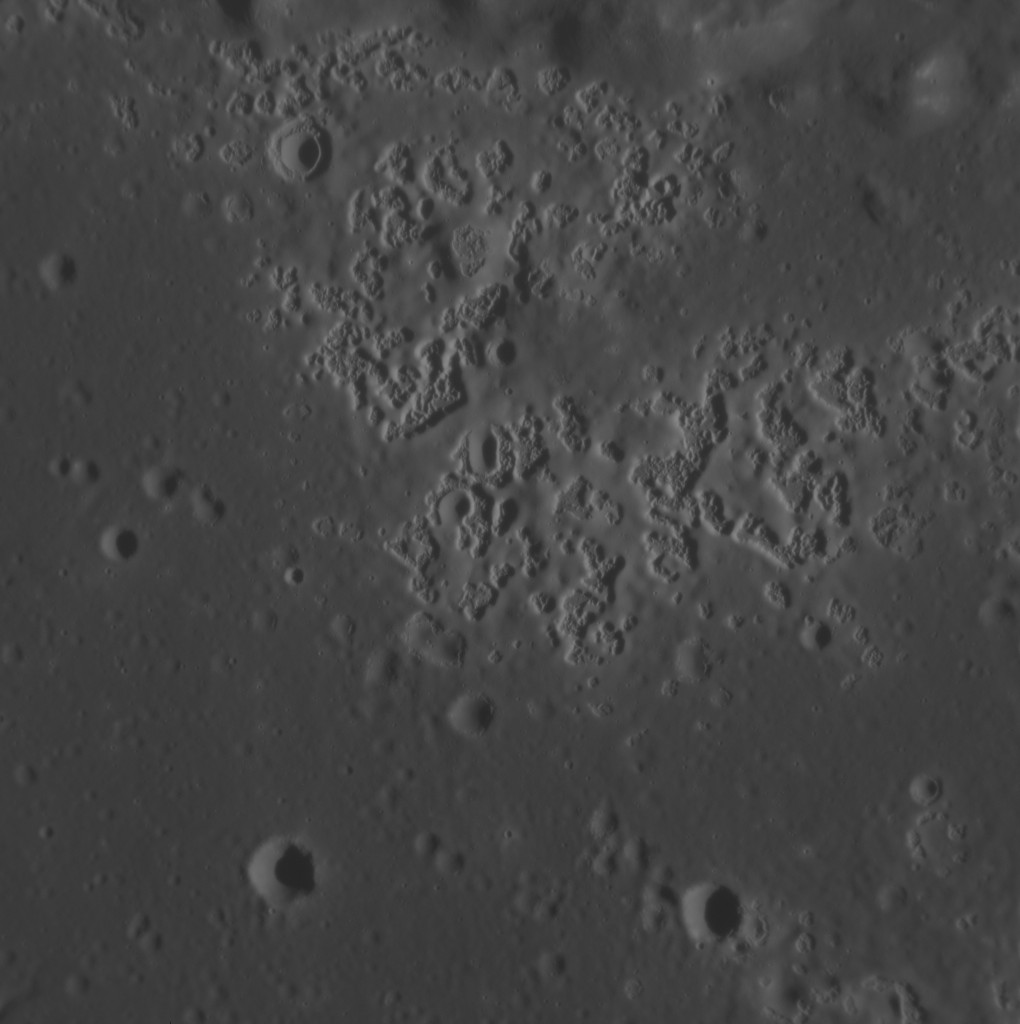
Detail of hollow in northern Zeami crater

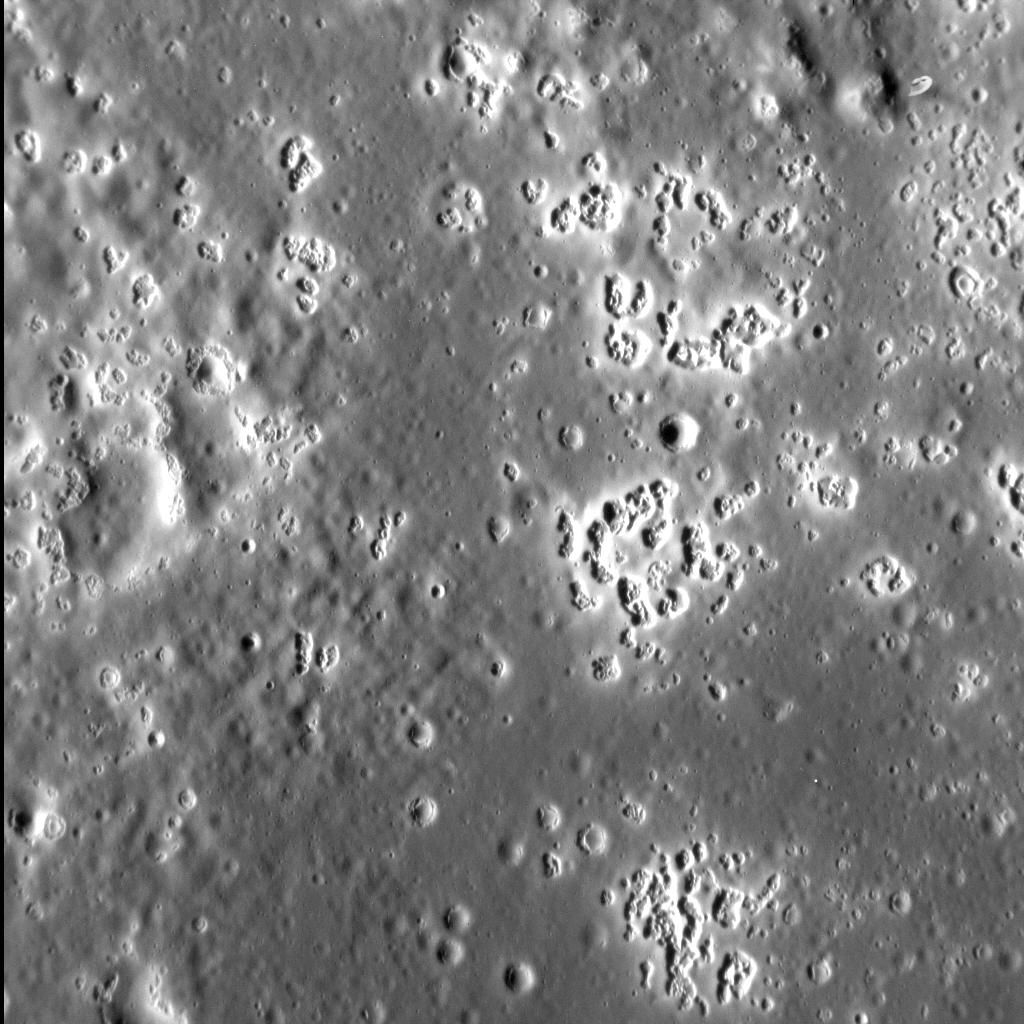
Another detail of hollows in the crater
