= Budh Planitia =

Planitia on Mercury

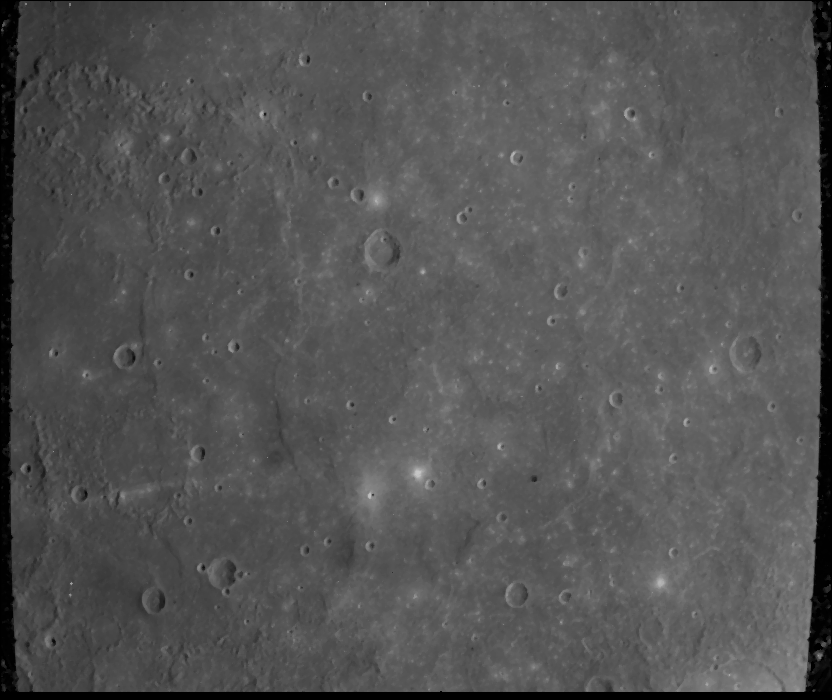
- Mariner 10 image of most of Budh Planitia
- Feature type: Planitia
- Location: Tolstoj quadrangle, Mercury
- Coordinates: 22.0°N 150.9°W
- Eponym: Budha

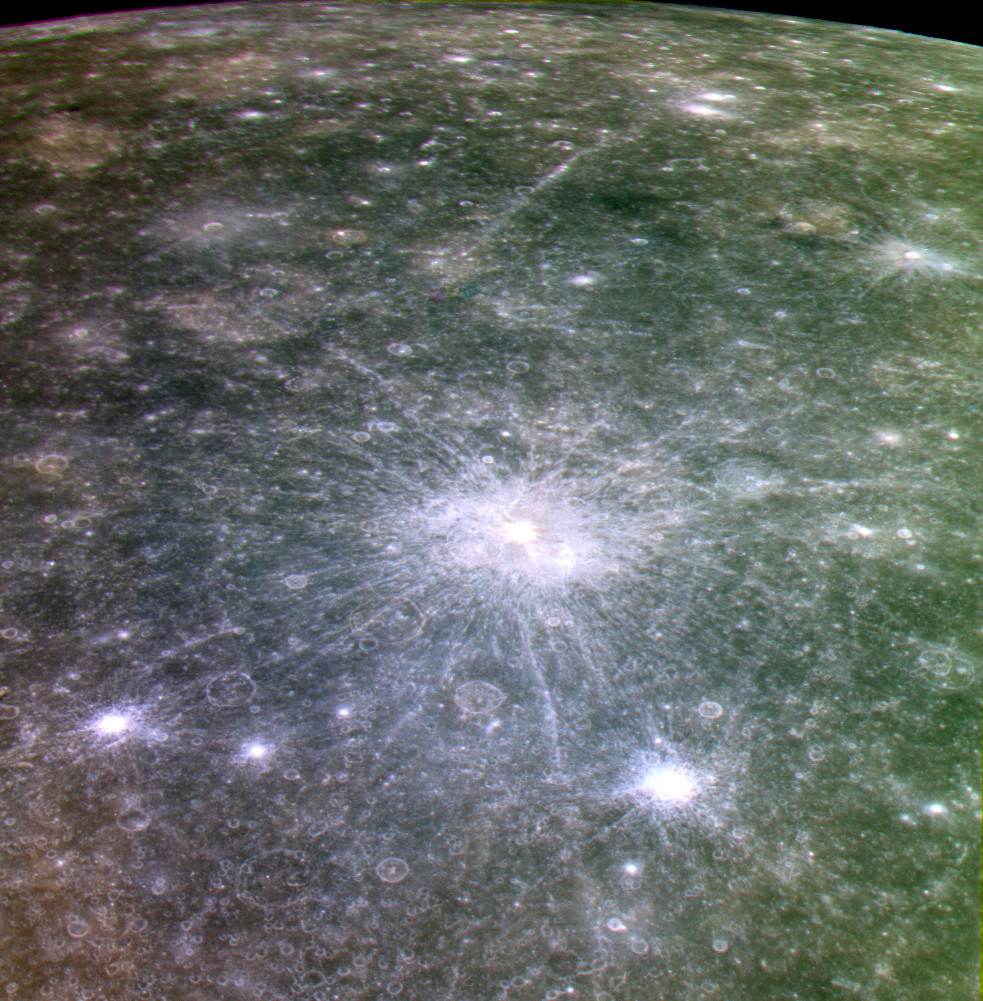
Oblique view by MESSENGER in exaggerated color, with Budh Planitia in the background. The crater at center with rays is Nureyev.

Budh Planitia is a large plain on Mercury. It lies to the east of Odin Planitia. It falls within the Tolstoj quadrangle. It was named after the Hindu word for Mercury, Budha, in 1976. The region was first imaged by Mariner 10 in 1974.

There are no major craters within Budh Planitia. It lies to the north of the large crater Phidias, and to the south of Couperin.
