= Sophocles (crater) =

Crater on Mercury

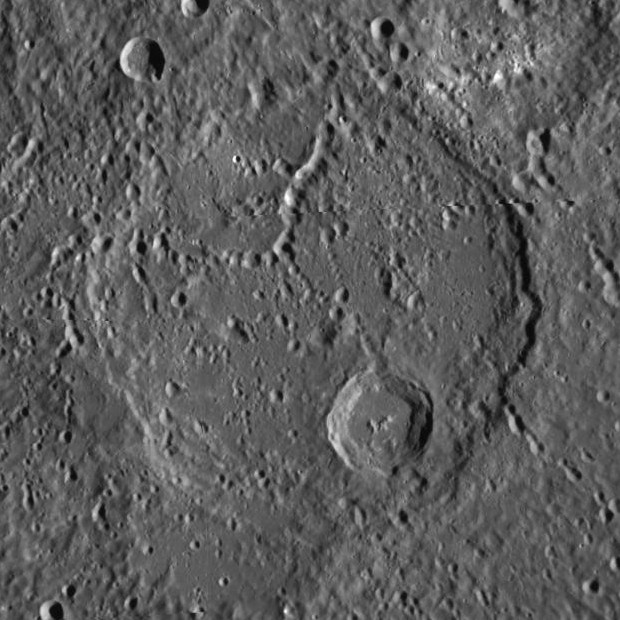
- MESSENGER WAC mosaic
- Planet: Mercury
- Coordinates: 6.95°S 146.04°W
- Quadrangle: Tolstoj
- Diameter: 142 km (88 mi)
- Eponym: Sophocles

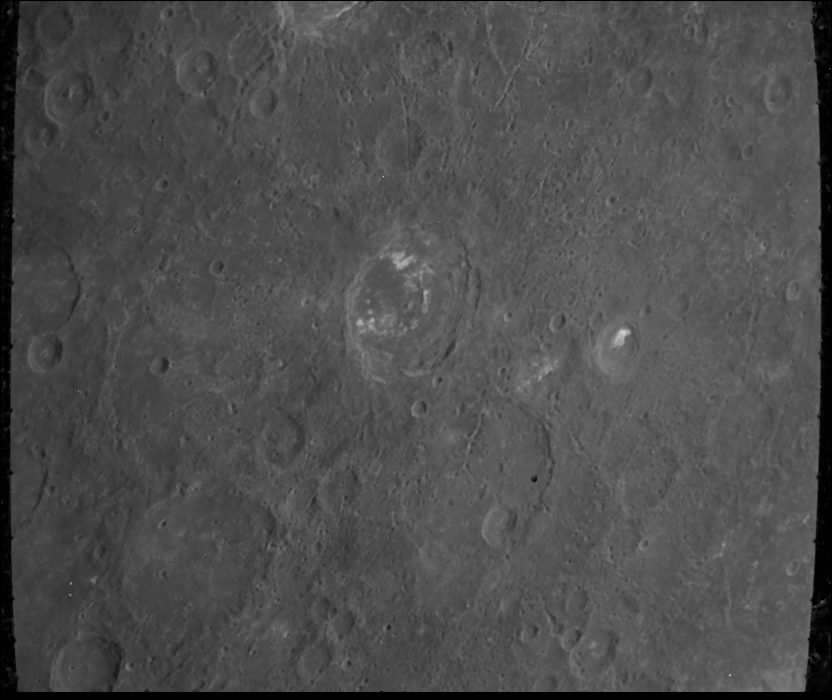
Mariner 10 image with Sophocles below center (Zeami is at center)

Sophocles is a crater on Mercury. Its name was adopted by the International Astronomical Union in 1976, after the Greek dramatist Sophocles.

Zeami crater is to the north of Sophocles, and Goya is to the west.
