= Couperin (crater) =

Crater on Mercury

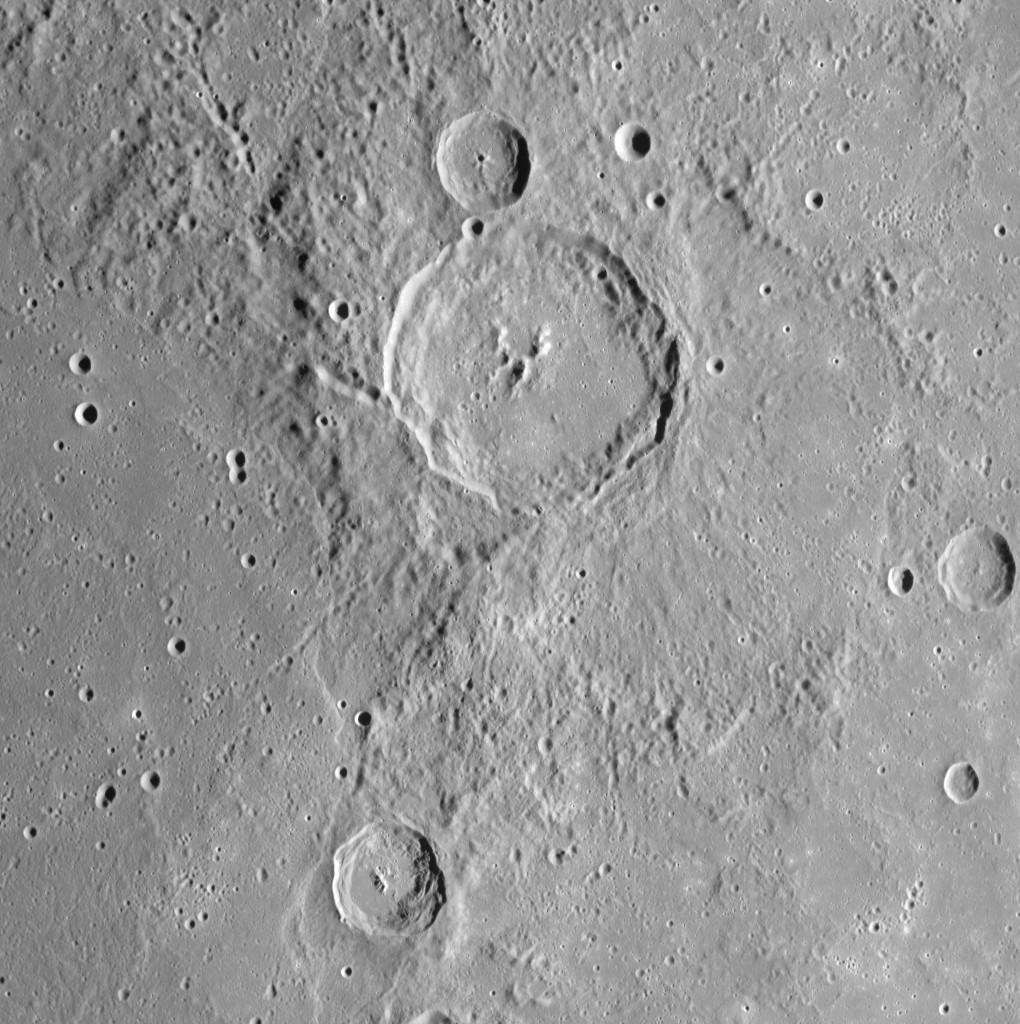
- MESSENGER WAC image
- Feature type: Impact crater
- Location: Shakespeare quadrangle, Mercury
- Coordinates: 29.8°N 151.4°W
- Diameter: 80 km (50 mi)
- Eponym: François Couperin

Couperin is a crater on Mercury. It has a diameter of 80 kilometers. Its name was adopted by the International Astronomical Union (IAU) in 1979. Couperin is named for the French composer François Couperin, who lived from 1688 to 1733.

Couperin is in the highlands north of Budh Planitia.

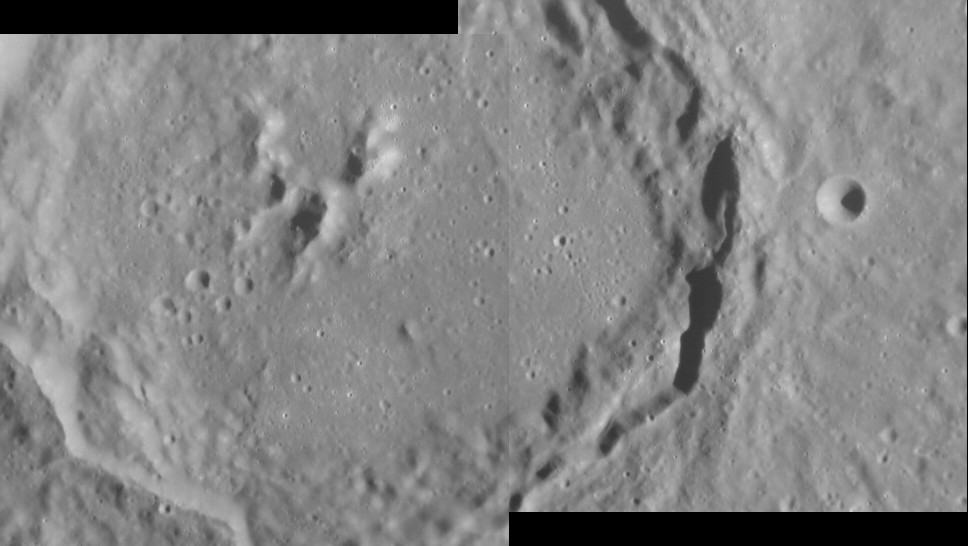
Mosaic of MESSENGER Narrow Angle Camera images

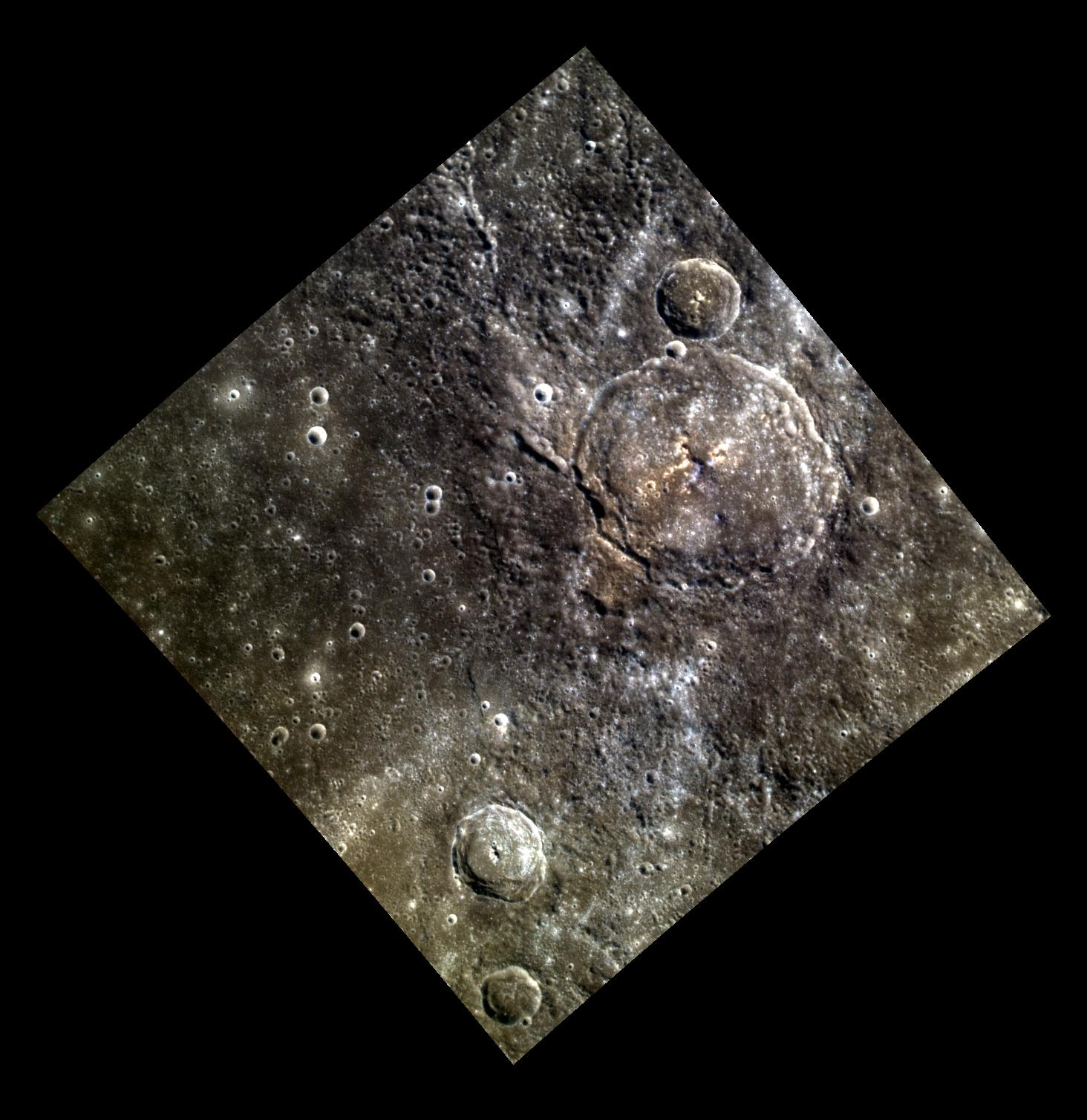
Couperin crater in approximate color
