= Mozart (crater) =

Crater on Mercury

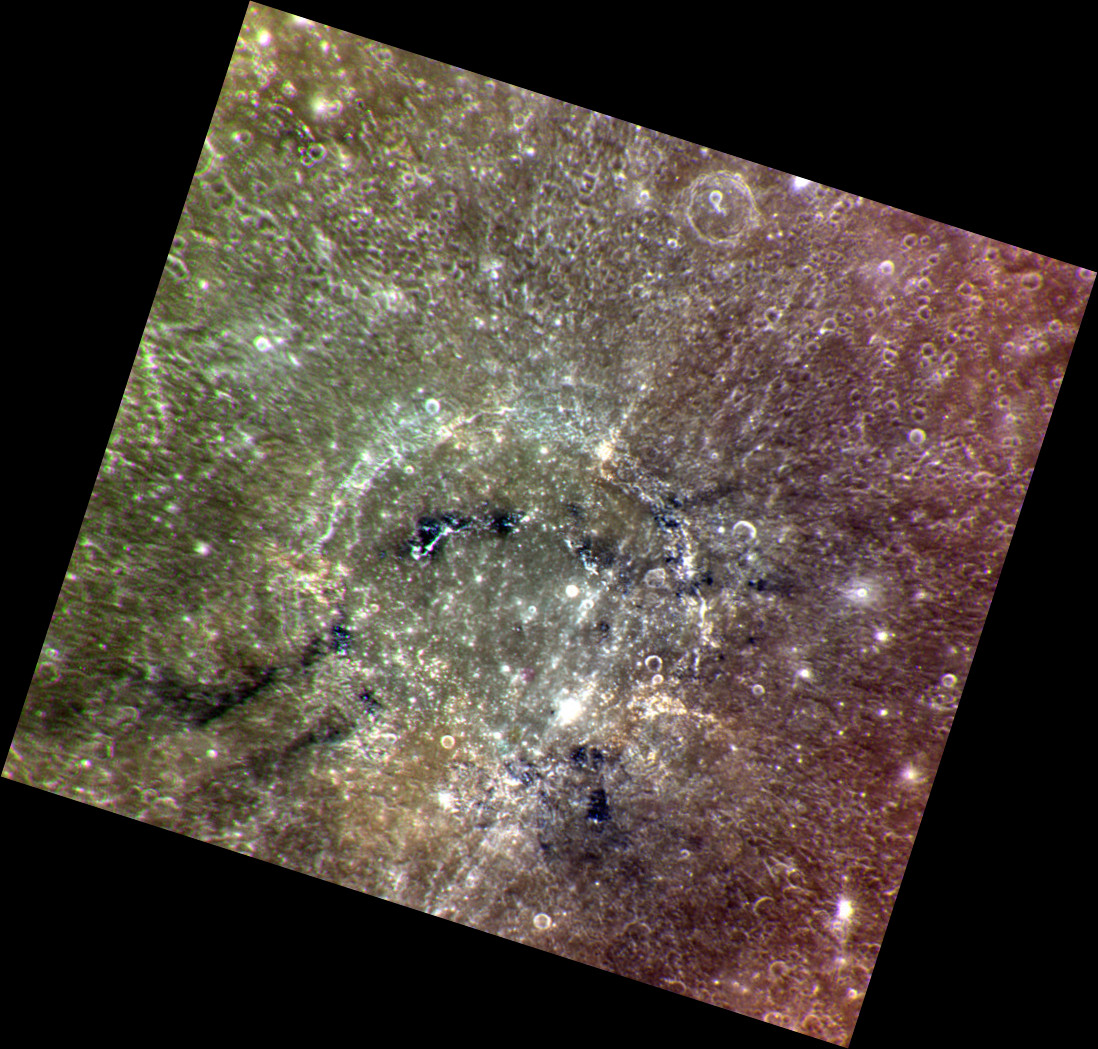
- Approximate color image by MESSENGER
- Feature type: Impact crater
- Location: Tolstoj quadrangle, Mercury
- Coordinates: 7.75°N 190.59°W
- Diameter: 241 km (150 mi)
- Eponym: Wolfgang Amadeus Mozart

Mozart is a crater on Mercury, named by the IAU in 1976 after Austrian composer Wolfgang Amadeus Mozart.

The arc of dark hills visible on the crater's floor represents remnants of a central peak ring. Mozart is one of 110 peak ring basins on Mercury. A close inspection of the area around Mozart crater shows many long chains of secondary craters, formed by impact of material thrown out during the formation of the main crater.

Confirmed dark spots are present within Mozart. The dark spots are present around the remnants of the peak ring.

Mozart crater is located just south of the Caloris basin. To the southeast is Tir Planitia.

== Views ==
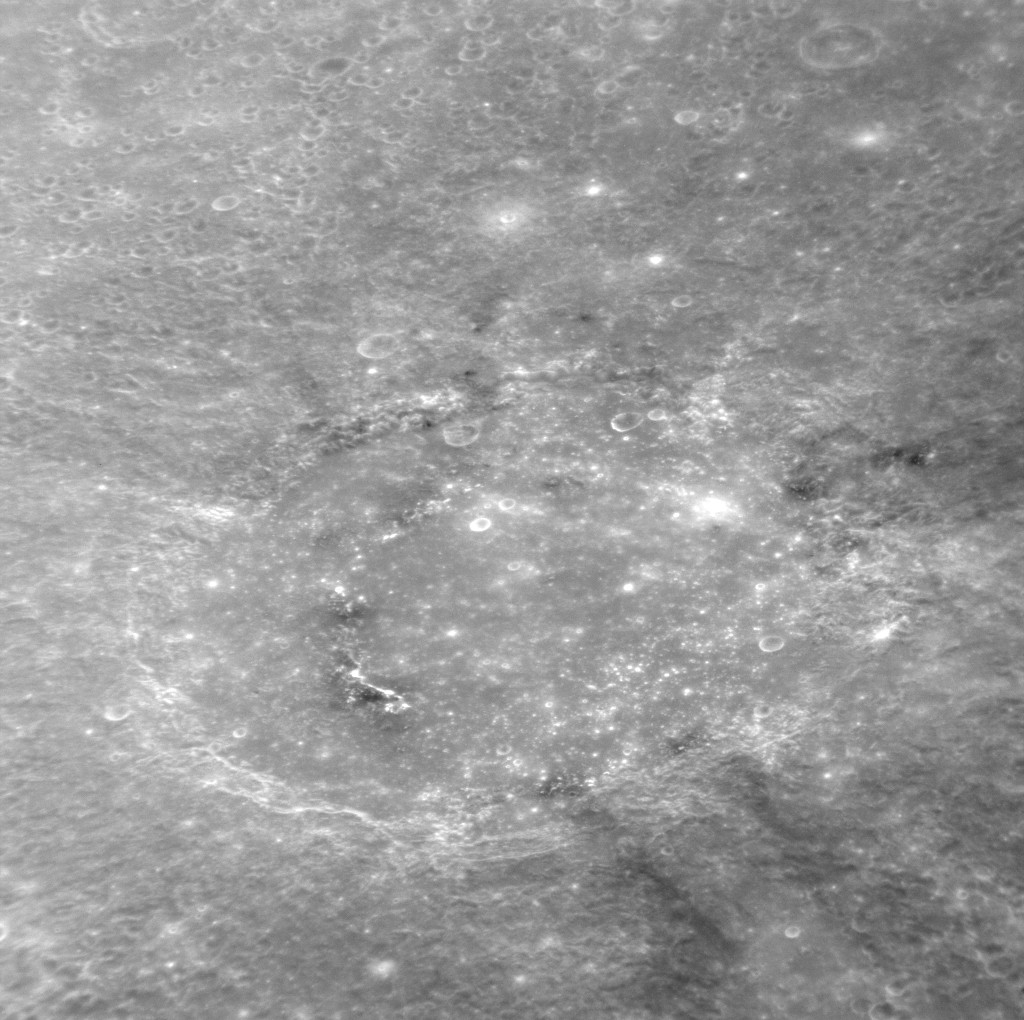
The first image of Mozart crater, acquired on MESSENGER's first flyby on 14 January 2008

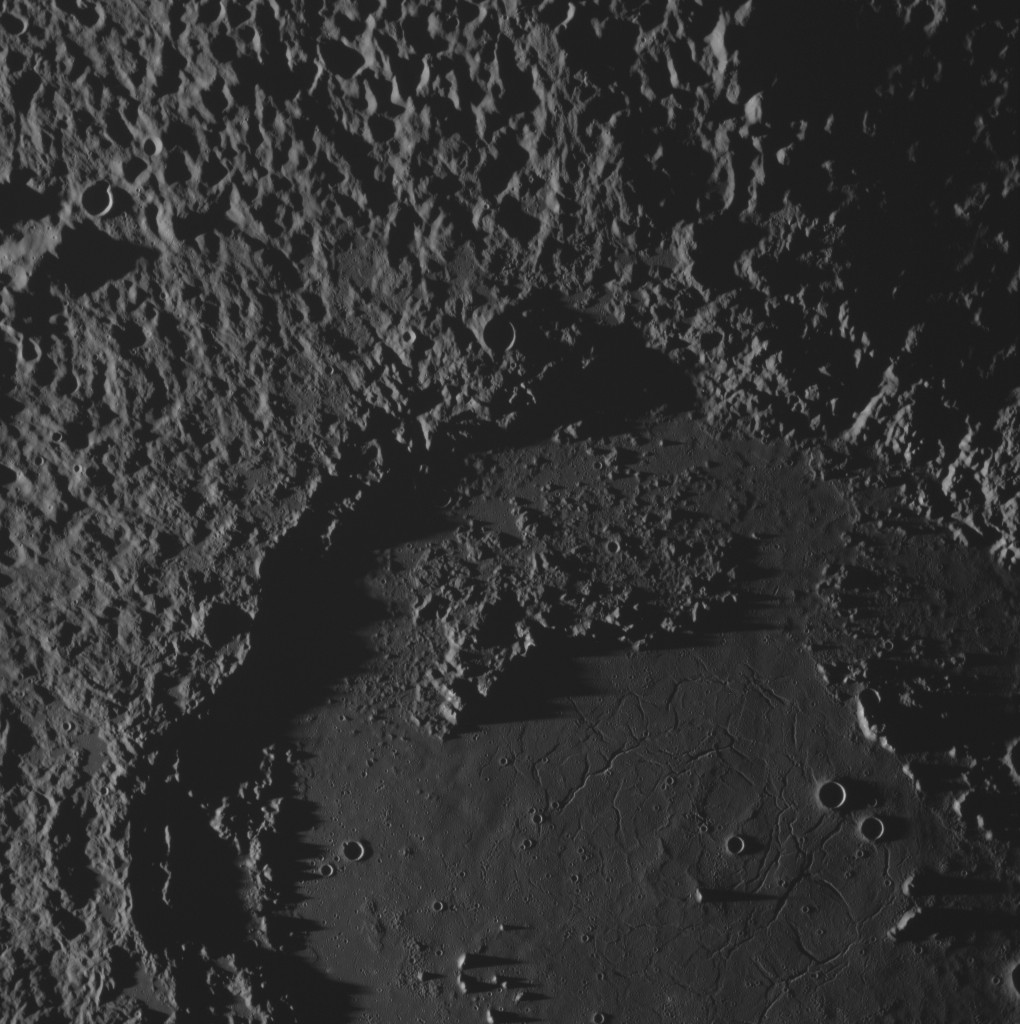
Another MESSENGER image of central and northwestern Mozart, at a low sun angle. Shows the fractures in its smooth floor in bottom right, parts of its peak-ring, and the hummocky ejecta blanket in the upper left.

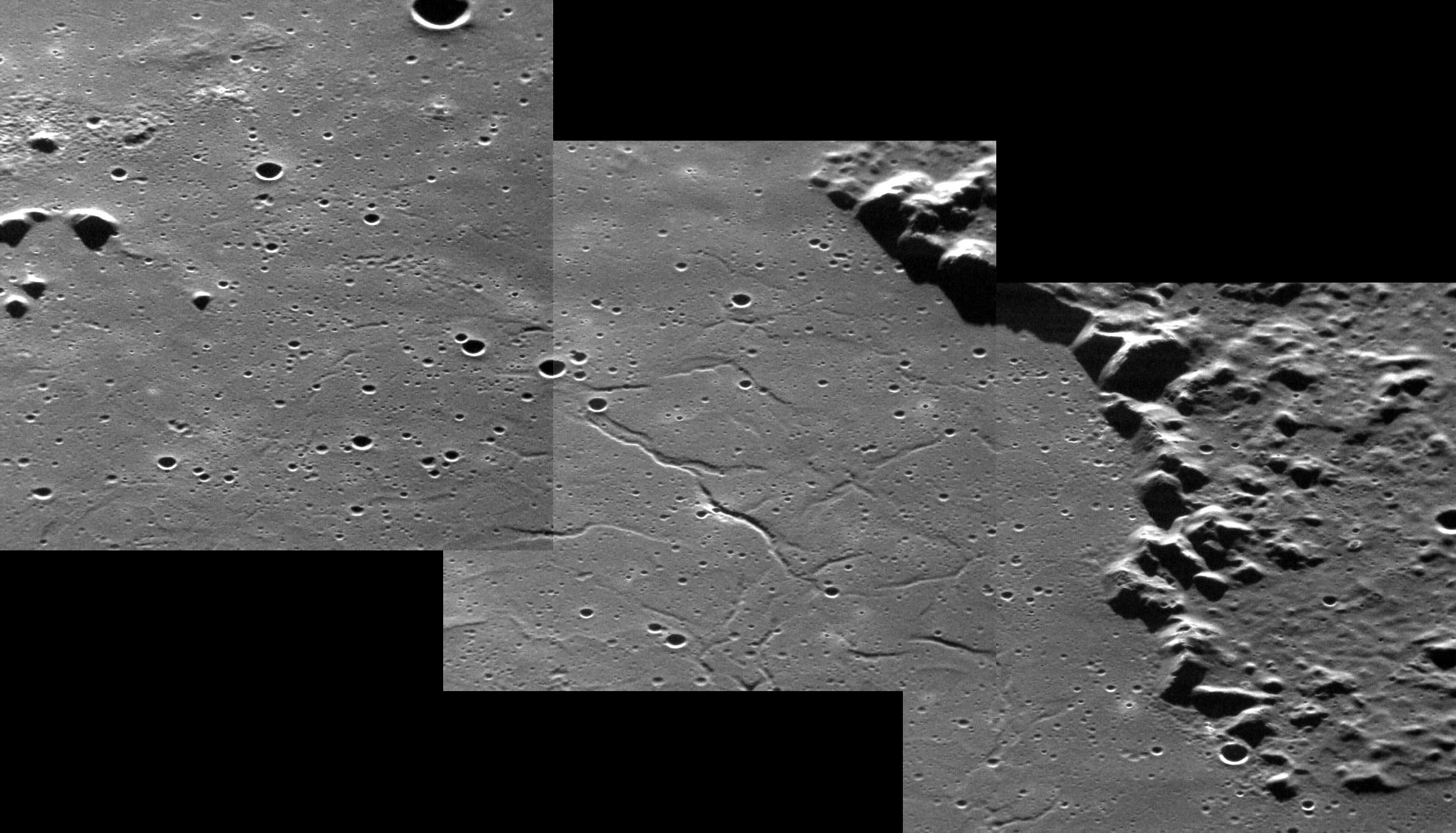
Mozart crater interior
