= Phidias (crater) =

Crater on Mercury

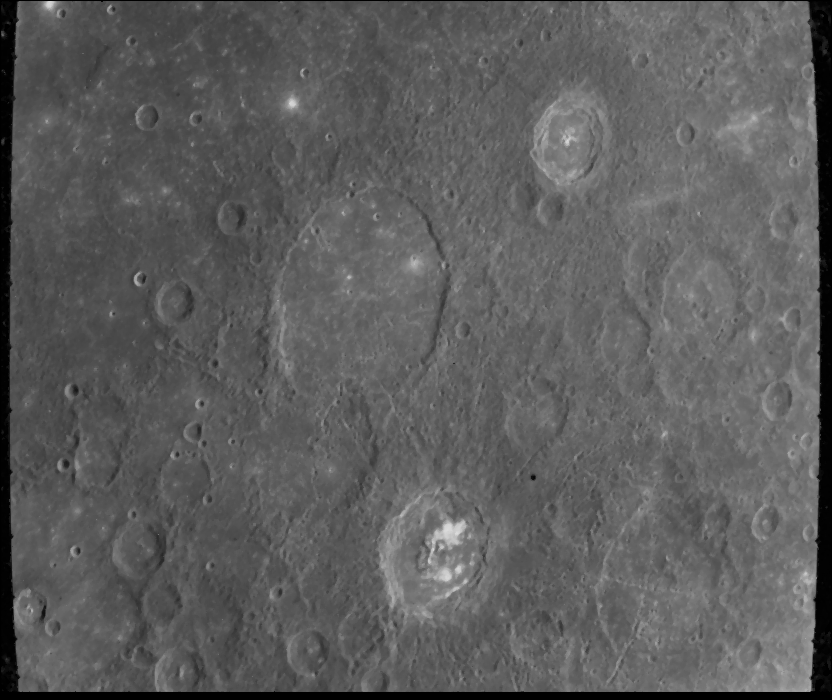
- Mariner 10 image with Phidias at center
- Feature type: Impact crater
- Location: Tolstoj quadrangle, Mercury
- Coordinates: 8.97°N 149.73°W
- Diameter: 168 km (104 mi)
- Eponym: Phidias

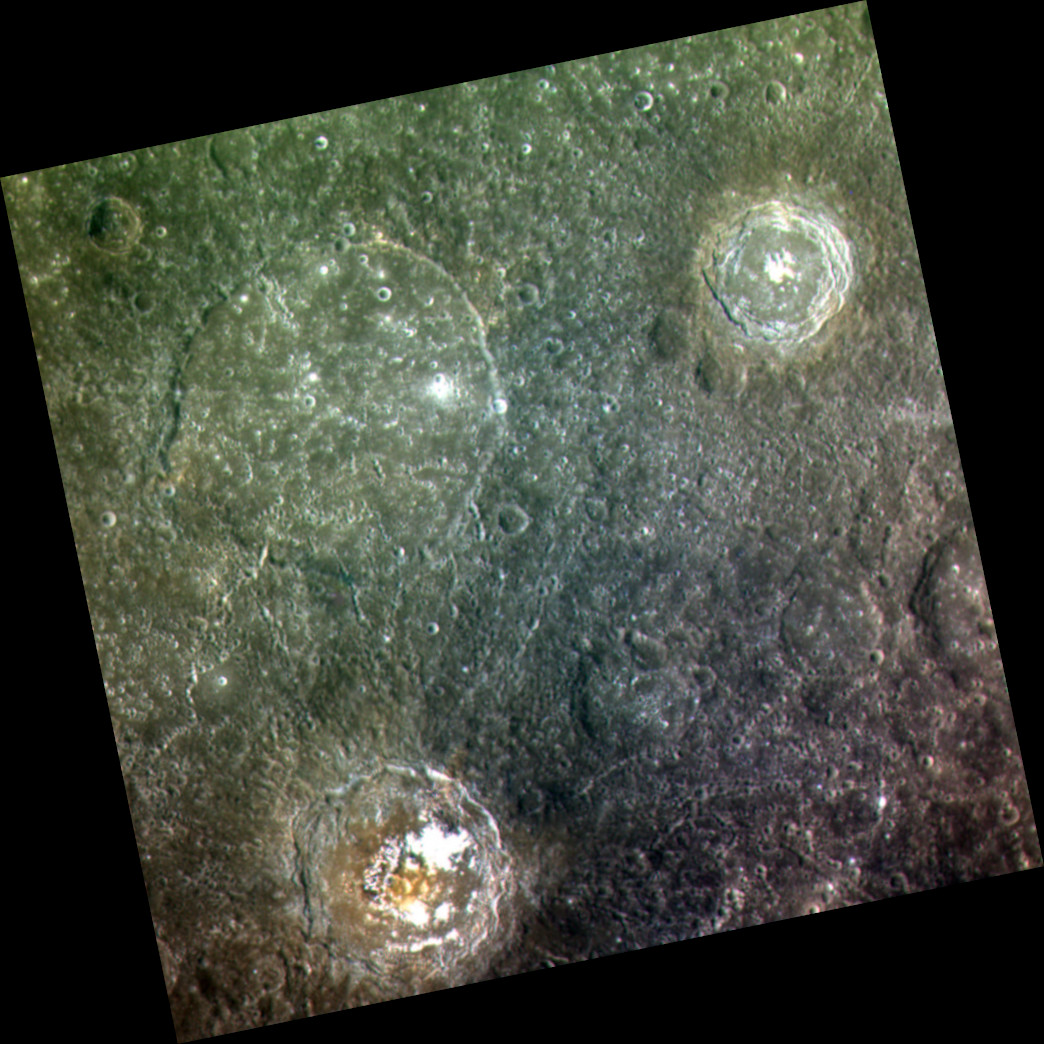
Approximate color image of Phidias (upper left), Tyagaraja (lower left), and Balzac (upper right) craters, from MESSENGER WAC

Phidias is a crater on Mercury. Its name was adopted by the International Astronomical Union (IAU) in 1976. Phidias is named for the Greek artist Phidias, who lived from 490 to 430 BCE. The crater was first imaged by Mariner 10 in 1974.

Nearby craters include Balzac to the east and Tyagaraja to the south.
