= Tyagaraja (crater) =

Crater on Mercury

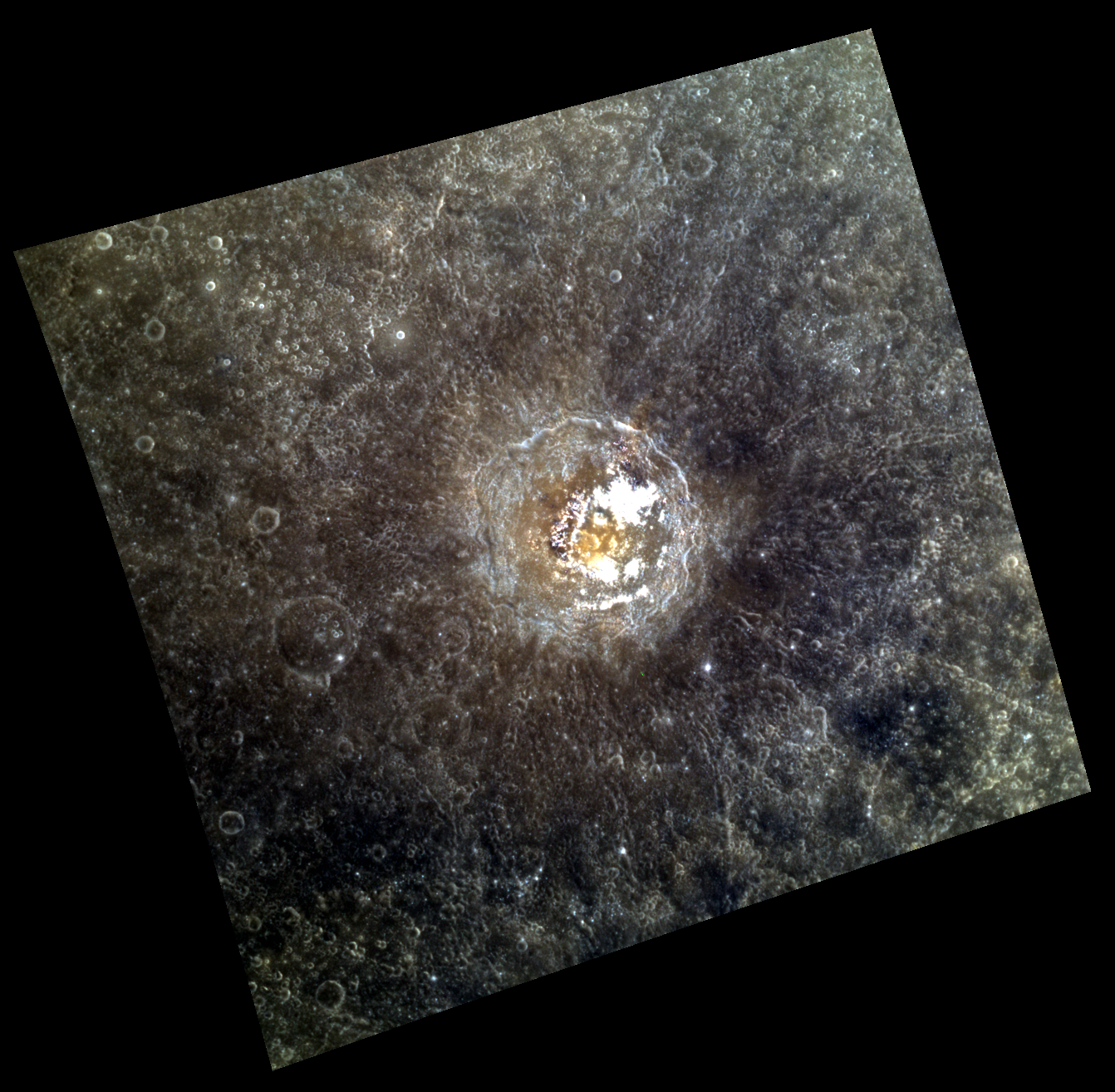
- MESSENGER image of Tyagaraja
- Feature type: Impact crater
- Location: Tolstoj quadrangle, Mercury
- Coordinates: 3.89°N 148.9°W
- Diameter: 97 km (60 mi)
- Eponym: Tyagaraja

Tyagaraja is a crater on Mercury. Its name was adopted by the International Astronomical Union in 1976. Tyagaraja is named for the Indian composer Tyagaraja. The crater was first imaged by Mariner 10 in 1974.

Tyagaraja is the third-largest crater of the Kuiperian system on Mercury, at 97 km diameter, after Bartók crater and Amaral crater.

Hollows are present within Tyagaraja. Within the extensive hollows of Tyagaraja is a dark spot of low reflectance material (LRM), closely associated with the central peak complex. Another prominent dark spot is located to the southwest of Tyagaraja, on the north rim of an unnamed crater.

An irregular depression is present within the central peak complex of the crater. This may be evidence of explosive volcanism.

The larger Phidias is to the north, and the crater Stevenson is to the east.

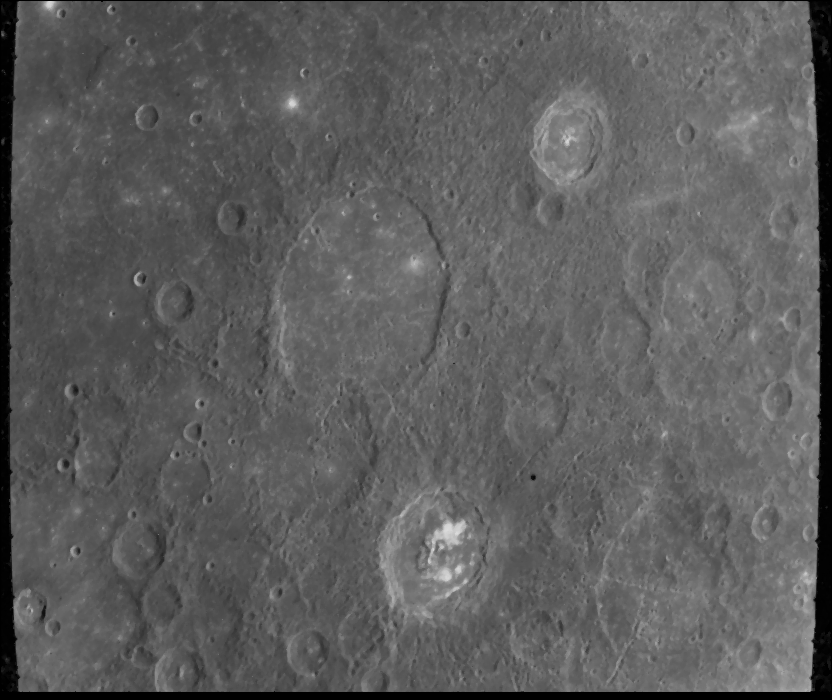
Mariner 10 image with Tyagaraja at bottom

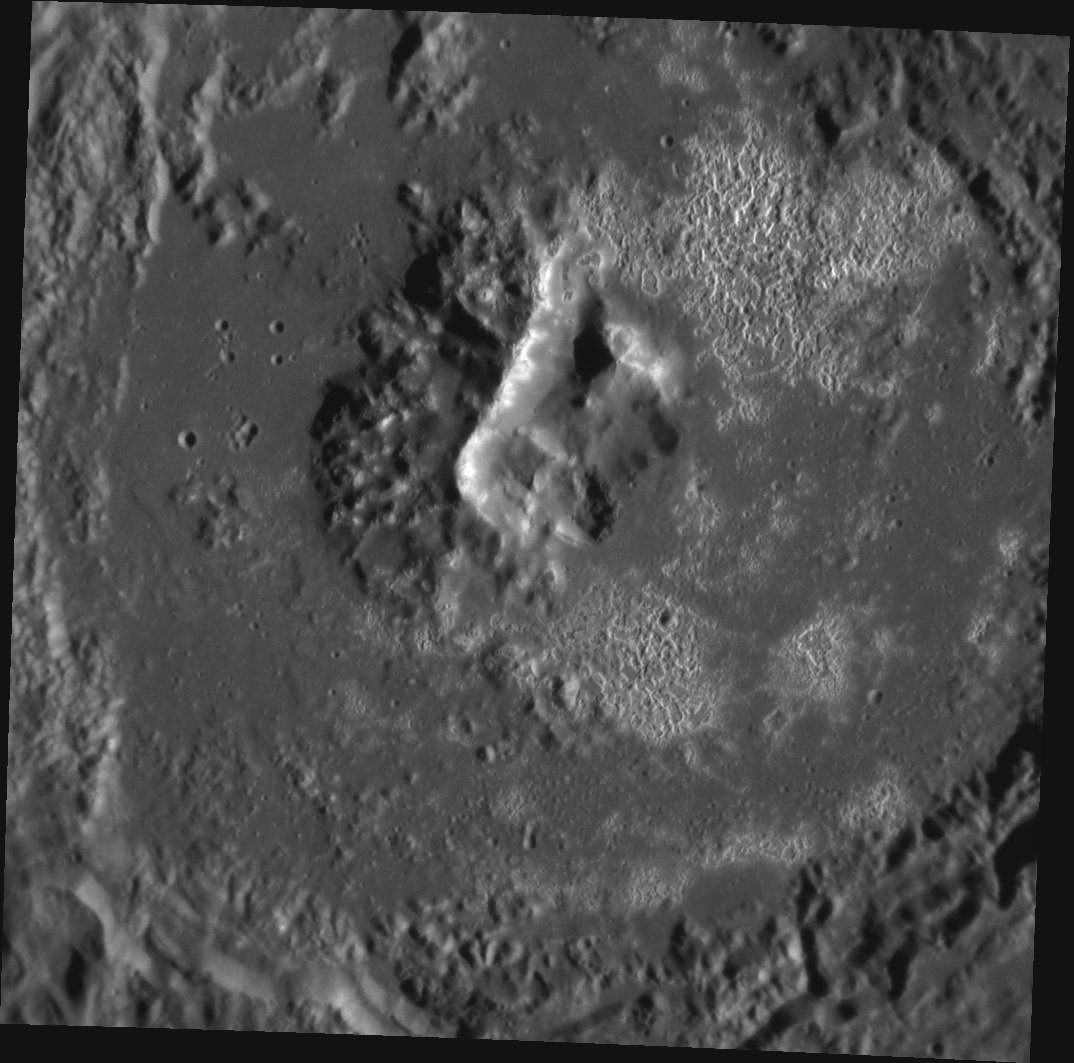
The interior of Tyagaraja, showing its hollows

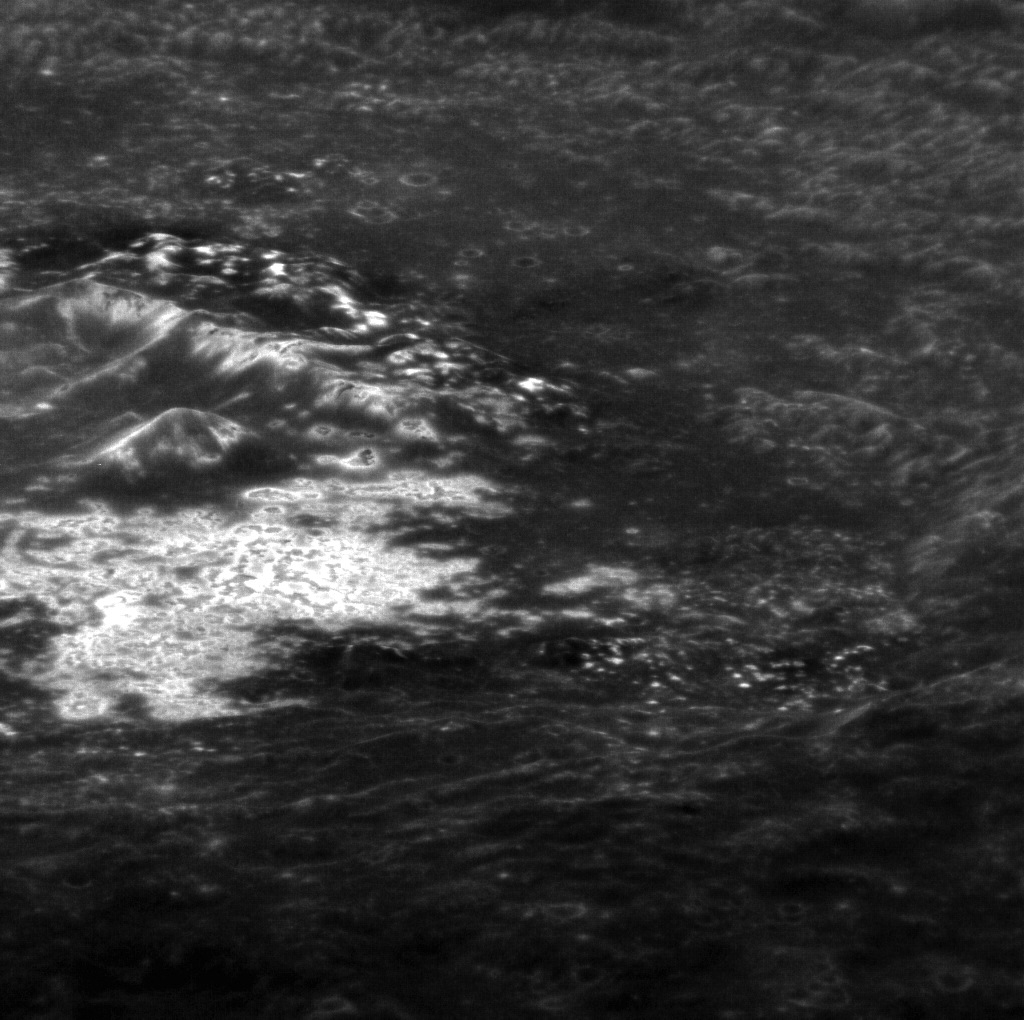
Oblique view also showing the hollows
