= Stevenson (crater) =

Crater on Mercury

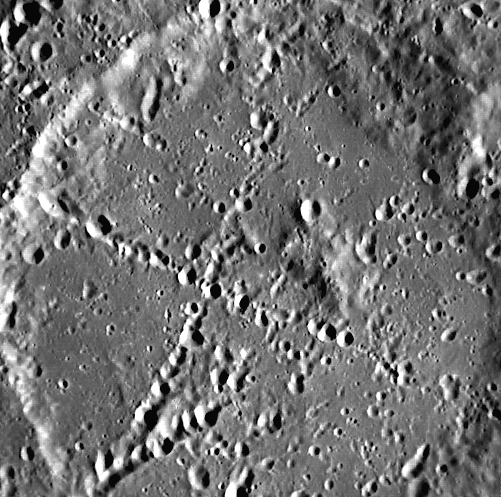
- MESSENGER image
- Planet: Mercury
- Coordinates: 2.05°N 143.88°W
- Quadrangle: Beethoven
- Diameter: 134 km (83 mi)
- Eponym: Robert Louis Stevenson

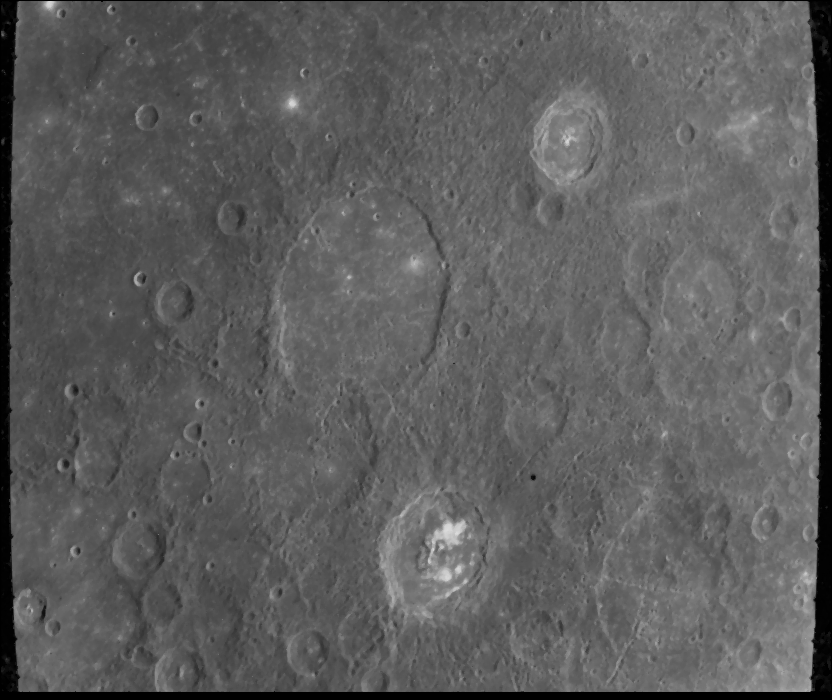
Mariner 10 image with Stevenson at lower right.

Stevenson is a crater on Mercury. Its name was adopted by the International Astronomical Union in 2012, after the Scottish author Robert Louis Stevenson. The crater was first imaged by Mariner 10 in 1974.

The crater is very old and is crisscrossed by chains of secondary impact craters.

The crater Tyagaraja is to the west of Stevenson.
