= Goya (crater) =

Crater on Mercury

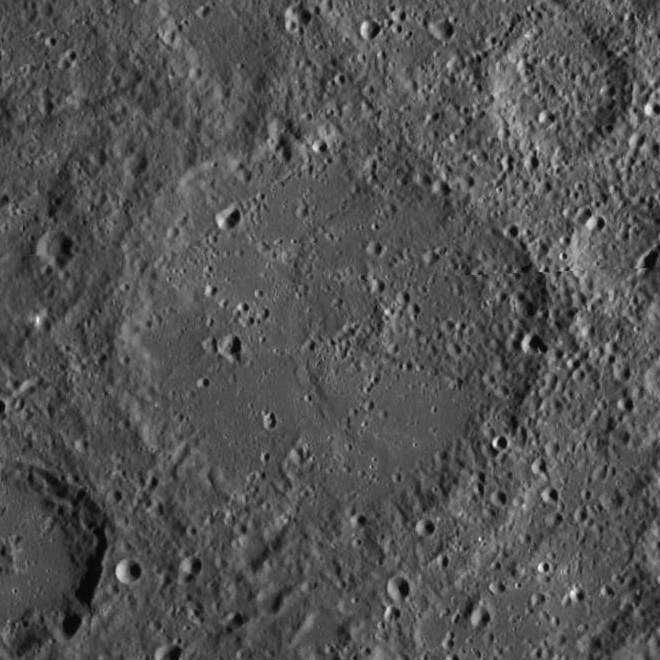
- MESSENGER WAC mosaic of Goya
- Feature type: Impact crater
- Location: Tolstoj quadrangle, Mercury
- Coordinates: 6.79°S 152.29°W
- Diameter: 138 km (86 mi)
- Eponym: Francisco Goya

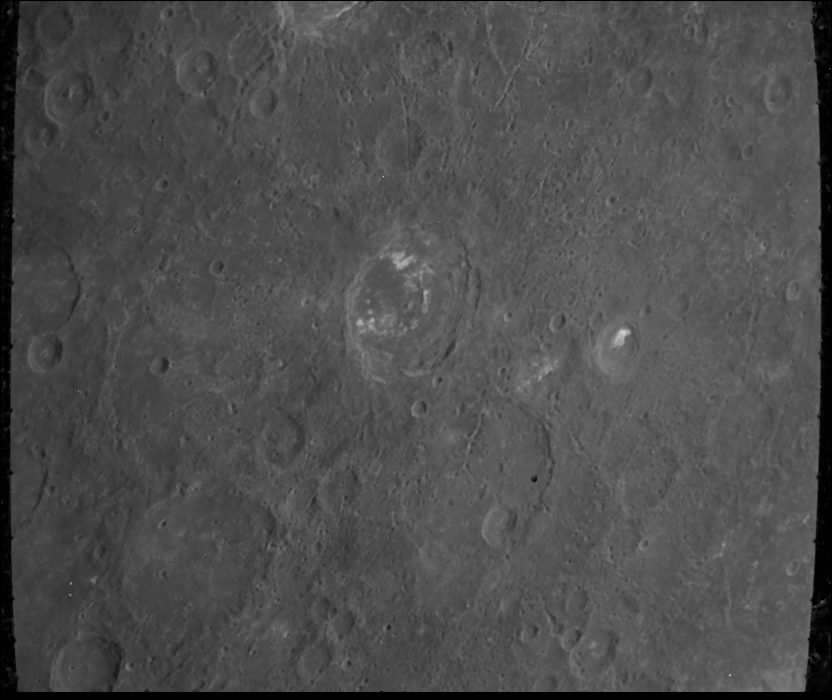
Mariner 10 image with Goya in lower left (Zeami is at center)

Goya is a crater on Mercury. It has a diameter of 135 kilometers. Its name was adopted by the International Astronomical Union (IAU) in 1976. Goya is named for the Spanish artist Francisco Goya, who lived from 1746 to 1828.
