= Tolstoj quadrangle =

Quadrangle on Mercury

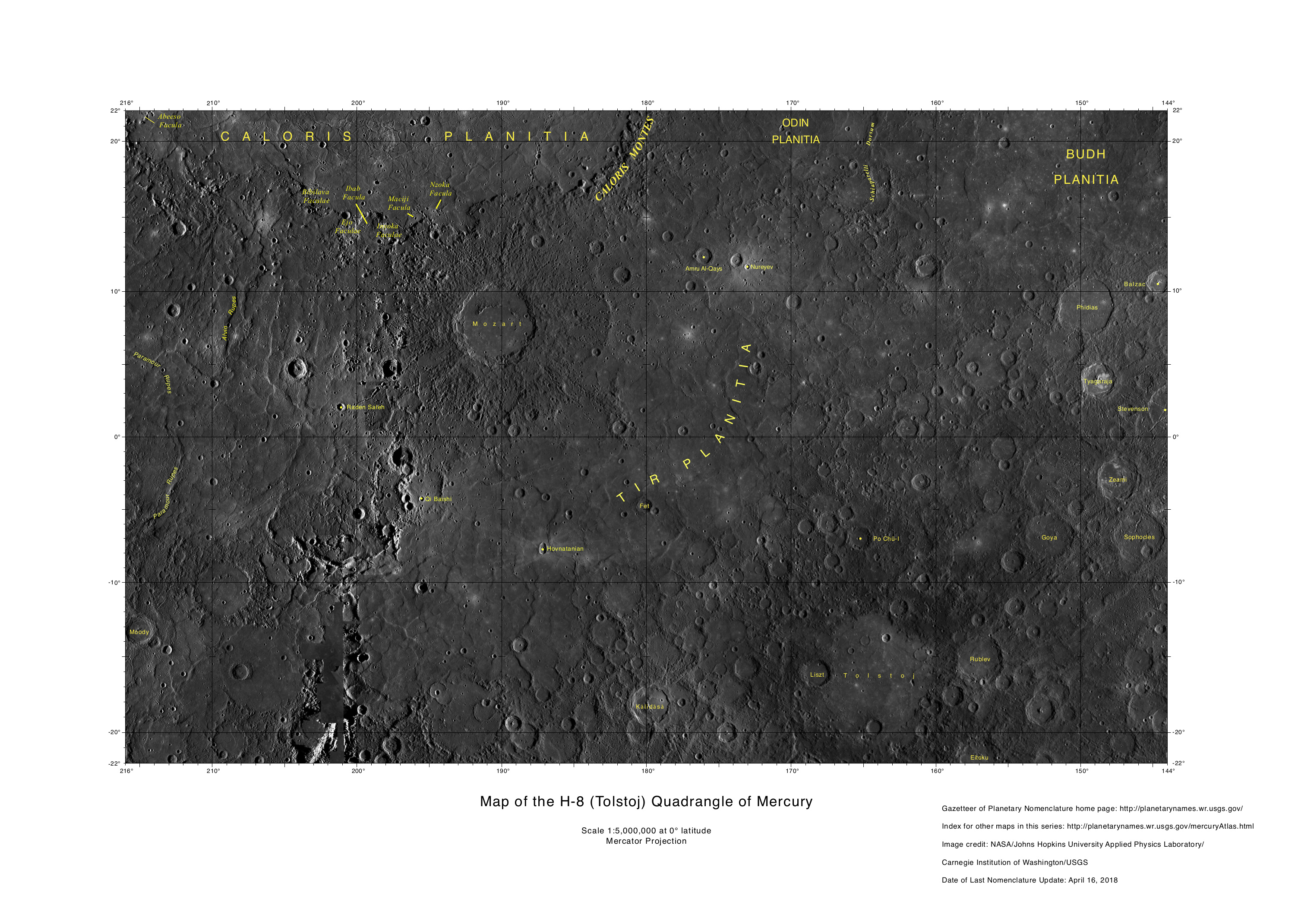
Tolstoj quadrangle as mapped by the MESSENGER spacecraft

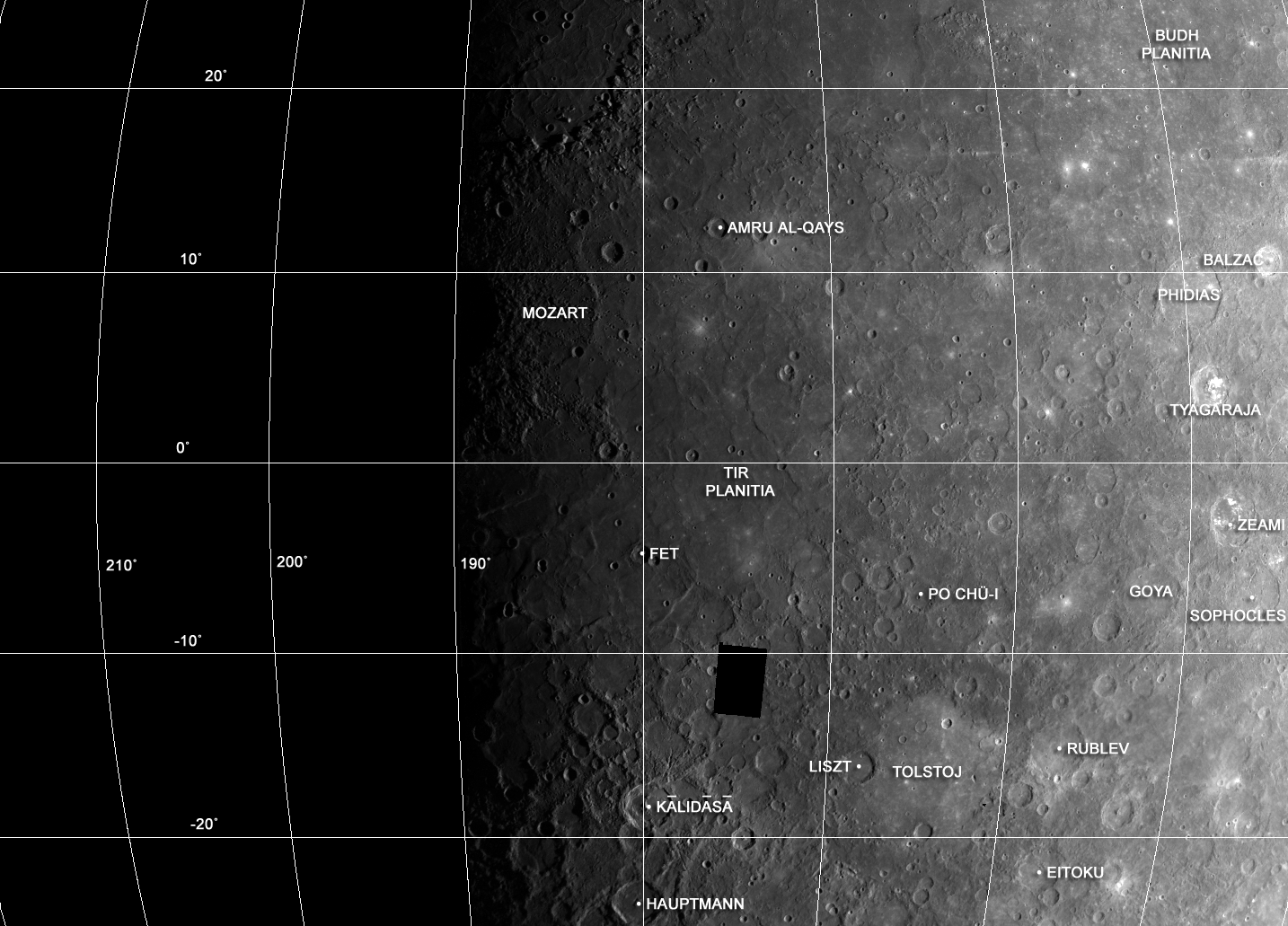
Mariner 10 photomosaic

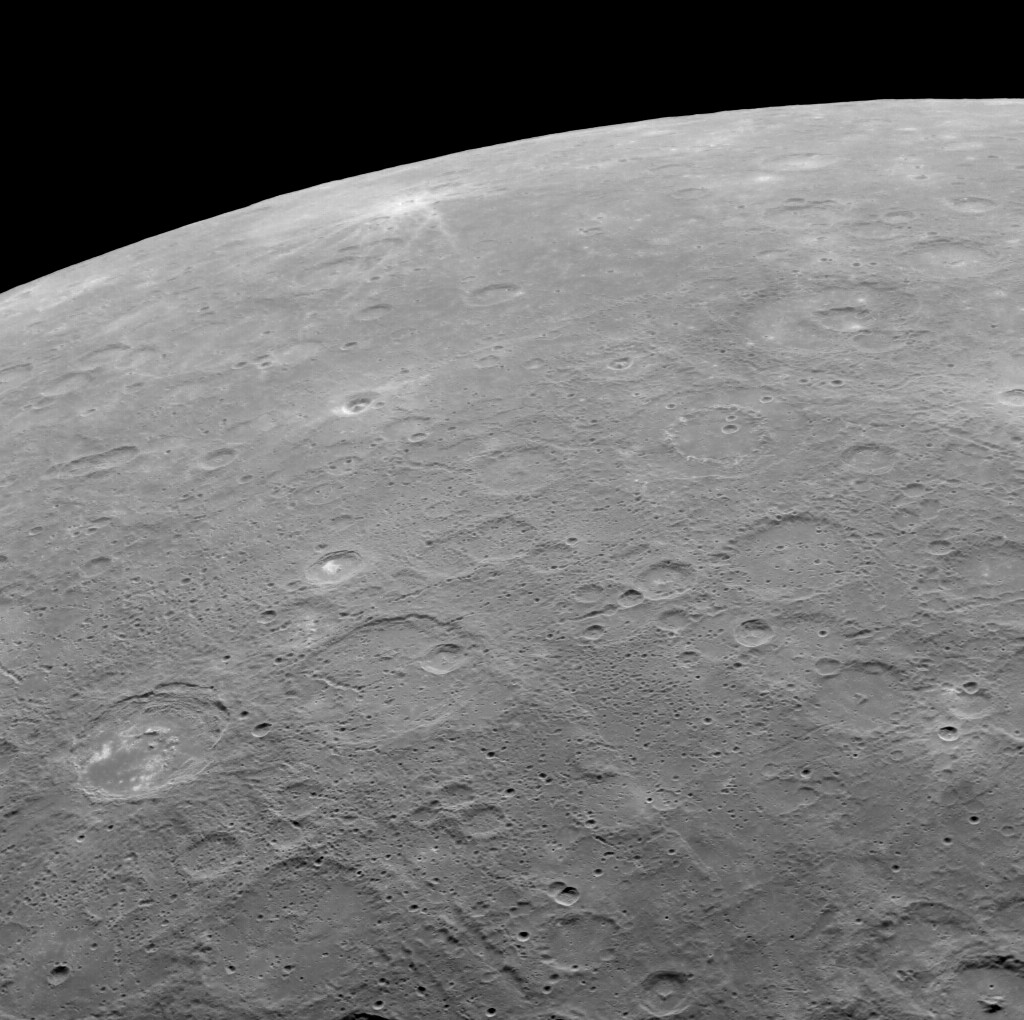
Part of eastern Tolstoj quadrangle is shown in the foreground, including Zeami, Sophocles, and Goya craters.

The Tolstoj quadrangle in the equatorial region of Mercury runs from 144 to 216° longitude and -25 to 25° latitude. It was provisionally called "Tir", but renamed after Leo Tolstoy by the International Astronomical Union in 1976. Also called Phaethontias.

It contains the southern part of Caloris Planitia, which is the largest and best preserved basin seen by Mariner 10. This basin, about 1550 km in diameter, is surrounded by a discontinuous annulus of ejecta deposits of the Caloris Group that are embayed and covered by broad expanses of smooth plains. The southeast half of the quadrangle is dominated by ancient crater deposits, by nondescript rolling to hummocky plains materials between individual craters, and by isolated patches of nondescript plains. The ancient and degraded Tolstoj multiring basin, about 350 km in diameter, is in the south-central part of the quadrangle. The large, well-preserved crater Mozart (285 km diameter) is a prominent feature in the western part of the area; its extensive ejecta blanket and secondary crater field are superposed on the smooth plains of Tir Planitia.

Low-albedo features Solitudo Neptunii and Solitudo Helii, adopted from telescopic mapping, appear to be associated with the smooth plains material surrounding Caloris; a third low-albedo feature, Solitudo Maiae, appears to be associated with the Tolstoj Basin.

Mercury's rotation period of 58.64 days is in two-thirds resonance with its orbital period of 87.97 days. Therefore, at its equator, longitudes 0° and 180° are subsolar points ("hot poles") near alternate perihelion passage. The "hot pole" at 180° lies within the Tolstoj quadrangle; at perihelion, equatorial temperatures range from about 100 K at local midnight to 700 K at local noon. This daily range of 600 K is greater than that on any other body in the Solar System.

Mariner 10 photographic coverage was available for only the eastern two-thirds of the Tolstoj quadrangle. The MESSENGER spacecraft, which orbited Mercury from 2008 to 2015, mapped the planet in its entirety at much higher resolution and in more wavelengths of light than Mariner 10. It obtained topographic, reflectance, magnetic, gravitational, and other types of geophysical data from orbit in addition to the photography.

Eminescu quadrangle is to the west of Tolstoj quadrangle, and Beethoven quadrangle is to the east. Raditladi quadrangle and Shakespeare quadrangle are to the northwest and northeast, and Neruda quadrangle and Michelangelo quadrangle are to the southwest and southeast.

== Stratigraphy ==
=== Older plains materials ===
The rolling to hummocky plains that lie between large craters in the southeastern part of the quadrangle make up the oldest recognizable map unit, the intercrater plains material. The plains were originally described as intercrater by Trask and Guest, who noted their level to gently rolling appearance and their general lack of well-defined craters larger than about 50 km in diameter. Malin showed the plains to contain highly eroded remnants of large craters and basins that are only very shallow circular depressions. These intercrater plains are, however, marked by a very high density of superposed craters that are small (5–10 km diameter), elongate, shallow, and probably secondary to the many large craters superposed on the plains. Superposition of crater ejecta over parts of intercrater plains in other areas indicates that some large craters formed in a preexisting intercrater plains unit. On the other hand, the intercrater plains material partly postdates some of the major cratering events on Mercury, according to apparent superposition relations. In particular, the unit appears to overlap the entire northwest side of the Tolstoj Basin, a feature indicating that the intercrater plains in this region probably do not represent the remains of the primordial surface of the planet. A complex history of contemporaneous craters and plains formation is therefore suggested. A detailed discussion of the origin of the intercrater plains on the Moon and Mercury was given by Strom.

Patches of less cratered, smoother, less rolling plains occur throughout the quadrangle, but their recognition is highly dependent on the resolution and lighting of individual Mariner 10 frames. Therefore, because their distribution cannot now be mapped accurately, many of these patches are included with the smooth plains material. Certain patches of these intermediate plains, where clearly rougher and possibly older, are mapped as the intermediate plains material. These patches occur mostly within the floors of ancient craters and are distinguished by a slightly greater density of small craters and a lower incidence of small bright-halo craters than are found on the smooth plains material. The presence of plains intermediate in roughness and crater density between the oldest plains and the post-Caloris plains suggests that plains formation was a more or less continuous process that spanned much of the early geologic history of Mercury.

=== Basin materials ===
The impact that produced the Tolstoj Basin occurred very early in the history of the quadrangle. Two ragged, discontinuous rings approximately 356 km and 510 km in diameter encompass the structure but are poorly developed on its north and northeast sides; a third partial ring with a diameter of 466 km occurs on its southeast side. Diffuse patches of material of dark albedo lie outside the innermost ring. The central part of the basin is covered by smooth plains material. Hapke and others have suggested that the dark-albedo materials associated with the Tolstoj Basin margins are distinctly bluer than the surrounding terrain, whereas the plains filling the interior are distinctly redder.

Despite Tolstoj's great age and its embayment by the ancient inter-crater plains, it retains an extensive and remarkably well preserved, radially lineated ejecta blanket around two-thirds of its circumference. The ejecta tends to be blocky and only weakly lineated between the inner and outer rings. Radial lineations with a slight swirly pattern are best seen on the southwest side of Tolstoj. The unusual rectilinear map pattern of the ejecta suggests: (1) control of the ejecta pattern by prebasin structures, (2) preferential burial along structural trends of an originally symmetrical ejecta blanket by the intercrater plains material, or (3) formation of Tolstoj by an oblique impact from the northwest that produced an ejecta blanket with bilateral symmetry and little or no deposition uprange. Analysis of stereo-photography of Tolstoj ejecta northeast of the crater suggests that this deposit has been upwarped to a higher elevation relative to the surrounding plains.

==== Caloris group ====
The Caloris Basin is especially significant from a stratigraphic standpoint. Like the Imbrium and Orientale Basins on the Moon, it is surrounded by an extensive and well-preserved ejecta blanket. As on the Moon, where ejecta from the better preserved basins was used to construct a stratigraphy, the ejecta from the Caloris Basin also can be used as a marker horizon. This ejecta is recognizable to a distance of about one basin diameter in the Tolstoj quadrangle and the adjacent Shakespeare quadrangle to the north. Undoubtedly, the ejecta also influences a large part of the as-yet-unseen terrain to the west. A stratigraphic and structural comparison between the Orientale and Caloris Basins has been made by McCauley. McCauley and others have proposed a formal rock stratigraphy for the Caloris Basin that we have adopted on the present map. This stratigraphy is patterned after that used in and around the Orientale Basin on the Moon and should aid in the future recognition of pre- and post-Caloris events over a broad expanse of the surface of Mercury. Crater degradation chronologies, such as the one modified from Trask, and correlations between plains units on the basis of crater frequency may aid in tying much of the remainder of the surface of Mercury to the Caloris event.

Unlike the Imbrium-related stratigraphy of Shoemaker and Hackman, that devised for Mercury is a rock rather than a time stratigraphy. It recognizes the existence of an orderly, in essence isochronous sequence of mappable units around Caloris that are similar in character to those recognized around the better preserved impact basins of the Moon such as Orientale, Imbrium, and Nectaris.

=== Younger plains materials ===
The Caloris floor plains material is a special problem and is not included in the Caloris Group. The plains have some features in common with the Maunder Formation in the floor of Orientale on the Moon but do not show the radial and circumferential ridges characteristic of the Maunder that led to its interpretation as a basin floor unit. The Caloris floor plains have a more open, coarser fracture pattern than does the Maunder. In addition, the Caloris ridges and the fractures cutting them have a crude rhombic pattern that led Strom and others to conclude that the plains materials subsided and then were gently uplifted to produce the open tension fractures observed. The ridges in the floor of Caloris lack the crenulated crests that are common on lunar ridges. Regardless of the origin and tectonic history of these plains, it seems clear that they represent a deep basin fill that obscures the original floor of the Caloris Basin.

The largest single expanse of the smooth plains material surrounds the Caloris Basin—mostly in Tir and Budh Planitiae—but many smaller patches occur in crater floors and other topographic depressions within the heavily cratered terrain in the southeastern part of the quadrangle. The plains are characterized by a relatively sparse crater density and an abundance of mare-type wrinkle ridges; overlap relations indicate that the plains are younger than the more densely cratered units. The plains also embay the Caloris Formation and account in particular for the skeletal map pattern of the Van Eyck Formation. The ubiquitous distribution of smooth plains in topographically low regions supports the hypothesis that these materials were deposited in a fluid or semifluid state as basin ejecta or volcanic flows. The plains are thought to be slightly younger but dose to the same age as the Caloris Basin materials; thus parts of the plains are probably Caloris ejecta, either impact melt or very fluid debris flows. No obvious secondary craters from Caloris have been recognized on the smooth plains. The presence of large patches of smooth plains in the floor of the Tolstoj Basin and in irregular depressions in the extreme southeastern part of the map indicates that at least some of these materials may be volcanic. However, the absence of unequivocal lava-flow fronts and well-defined volcanic vents such as those of the lunar maria prevents a firm conclusion regarding volcanic origin.

Small patches of very smooth plains material occur in the floors of many of the youngest craters. The patches may consist of fallback and impact melt related to the formation of individual craters and therefore may not represent late-stage volcanic fill or volcanic modification of the more youthful mercurian craters. Schultz suggested compositional differences or endogenic modification as possible causes of the color contrasts among the floor, wall, and rim areas of the dark-halo craters Zeami (129 km diameter), Tyagaraja (97 km diameter), and Balzac (67 km diameter). The dark ejecta and floors plains of these craters are distinctly redder than the surrounding plains, whereas their anomalously bright floor patches, central peaks, and wall areas are distinctly bluer. None of these dark-halo craters has associated bright rays, although secondary craters are well preserved. Compositional implications of contrasting color differences for mercurian crater and plains materials have been discussed by Hapke and others. The bright, bluish areas in these craters are now known to be hollows.

== Structure ==
The circumbasin scarps around Caloris, Tolstoj, and Mozart are the most prominent structural features in the quadrangle. The main Caloris Montes scarp is thought to approximate the edge of the basin of excavation of Caloris and is probably a structural and stratigraphic counterpart of the Montes Rook scarp around the Orientale Basin on the Moon. A subdued outer scarp is present around most of the visible part of Caloris, better seen in the Shakespeare quadrangle to the north. This scarp is generally coincident with the transition between the massifs of the Caloris Montes Formation and the lineated facies of the Van Eyck Formation. The roughly rectilinear outlines of massifs within the Caloris Montes suggest structural control by a prebasin fracture pattern. The much lower, discontinuous outer scarp is considered to be the feeble equivalent of the Montes Cordillera scarp around Orientale. Like the Cordillera, it probably lies outside the limit of the crater of excavation. Its poor development and spacing much closer to the edge of the basin may be due to the greater mercurian gravity, as described by Gault and others. The Van Eyck Formation is characterized by an extensive radial ridge-and-valley system with minor concentric scarps and lineaments. These features are considered for the most part as gouges and depositional plumes from secondary cratering within the Van Eyck; the remarkably straight ridges and steep walls, however, suggest formation by fracturing.

Only a small part of the ridge and fracture system that characterizes the floor of Caloris is within the quadrangle. The ridges in the floor of Caloris, which are like those within the smooth plains, do not appear to be as complex as lunar mare ridges and are cut by numerous open grabenlike gashes. This area and its antipode in the Discovery quadrangle are the only two on Mercury where tensional forces can now be seen to have shaped the surface.

The Tolstoj Basin is encompassed by parts of at least three ragged and discontinuous inward-facing scarps. Lineated ejecta is best developed in the vicinity of and beyond the outer scarp, whereas blocky materials occur between the inner and outer scarps. These relations are similar to those around Caloris, although Tolstoj is less than half its size and is much more severely degraded by later impact cratering.

The sharpness of the single rim-scarp of Mozart reflects the youth (younger than the smooth plains) of this large impact. The position of Mozart at the west terminator of the Mariner 10 image data precludes visibility of its floor and thus hides any evidence of a possible central uplift or inner structural ring.

Lobate scarps or ridges, which are best seen within the smooth plains material and vary locally within the intercrater plains material, are generally steep on one side and gently dipping on the other. Some, like the lunar mare ridges, appear to mark the outlines of subjacent craters. Most workers, particularly Strom and others, Melosh, and Melosh and Dzurisin, have ascribed these ridges to compression and a slight shortening of the crust of Mercury after formation of most of the present surface. Some ridges, however, may represent flow fronts, but their estimated heights of several hundred meters would require formation by extraordinarily viscous lavas.

Numerous faint lineaments are visible within the quadrangle, especially in the area between the Tolstoj Basin and the large crater Zeami to the northeast. Many of these lineaments may be faint secondary-crater chains or gouges; others may represent traces of an ancestral structural pattern that partly controlled the excavation of the craters and basin. The lineaments may have been enhanced or preserved by the gentle upwarping of this region of Tolstoj ejecta discussed above. The largest lineament, which marks the northwest limit of recognizable Tolstoj ejecta, is a subdued scarp some 450 km long. Rejuvenation of earlier faults or fractures by subsequent impacts probably occurred throughout the history of the planet. Thus, except for the lobate compressional scarps, it is difficult to separate internally produced structures from those of the complex impact history of Mercury. The azimuthal trends of all lineaments mapped within the quadrangle are, however, dominantly northwest (315°) and northeast (35°–40°). A minor, almost north–south trend is also observed. This situation is reminiscent of the so-called lunar grid on the Moon, which is generally ascribed to planetwide internal causes.

== Geologic history ==
The interpretable geologic history within the Tolstoj quadrangle begins with the period of formation of the intercrater plains, which persisted until shortly after impact of the asteroid that created the Tolstoj Basin. After this event was a period of only slightly less intense bombardment. This period was followed by impact of the asteroid that created the Caloris Basin and deposits of the Caloris Group. Although the intermediate plains were resurfaced at the time of the Caloris impact, their formation actually extended from the end of the intercrater plains-forming period through the end of formation of c3 craters. At about the time the last c3 craters and the first c4 craters were being formed, the upper surface of the smooth plains and Caloris floor plains were being emplaced. Part of the smooth plains and Caloris floor plains materials may have been deposited during or immediately after the Caloris event.

After the emplacement of most of the smooth plains, some late c3 craters and all c4 and c5 craters, including the large crater Mozart, were superposed on all previous deposits. The recognizable geologic history of the quadrangle ends with these events probably several billion years ago. A summary of the generalized geology history of Mercury was given by Guest and O'Donnell and Davies and others.

== Sources ==
- Schaber, Gerald G.; John F. McCauley (1980). "Geologic Map Of The Tolstoj (H-8) Quadrangle Of Mercury" (PDF). Prepared for the National Aeronautics and Space Administration by U.S. Department of the Interior, U.S. Geological Survey. Published in hardcopy as USGS Miscellaneous Investigations Series Map I–1199, as part of the Atlas of Mercury, 1:5,000,000 Geologic Series. (Hardcopy is available for sale from U.S. Geological Survey, Information Services, Box 25286, Federal Center, Denver, CO 80225)

H-1 Borealis (features)
H-5 Hokusai (features)	H-4 Raditladi (features)	H-3 Shakespeare (features)		H-2 Victoria (features)
H-10 Derain (features)	H-9 Eminescu (features)	H-8 Tolstoj (features)	H-7 Beethoven (features)	H-6 Kuiper (features)
H-14 Debussy (features)	H-13 Neruda (features)	H-12 Michelangelo (features)		H-11 Discovery (features)
H-15 Bach (features)
