= Myro =

Myro may refer to:

== People ==
- Moero or Myro, a Greek female poet from Byzantium
- Myro of Rhodes, a Greek female philosopher

== Other ==
- Myro (spider), a genus of spider within the family Toxopidae

== See also ==
- Myron (disambiguation)
