= Strauss (crater) =

Crater on Mercury

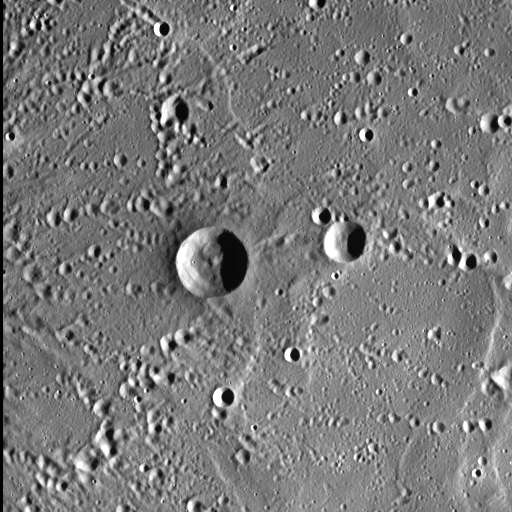
- MESSENGER WAC image
- Planet: Mercury
- Coordinates: 70.42°N 285.53°W
- Quadrangle: Borealis
- Diameter: 17 km
- Eponym: Johann Strauss I, Johann Strauss II, Richard Strauss, et al.

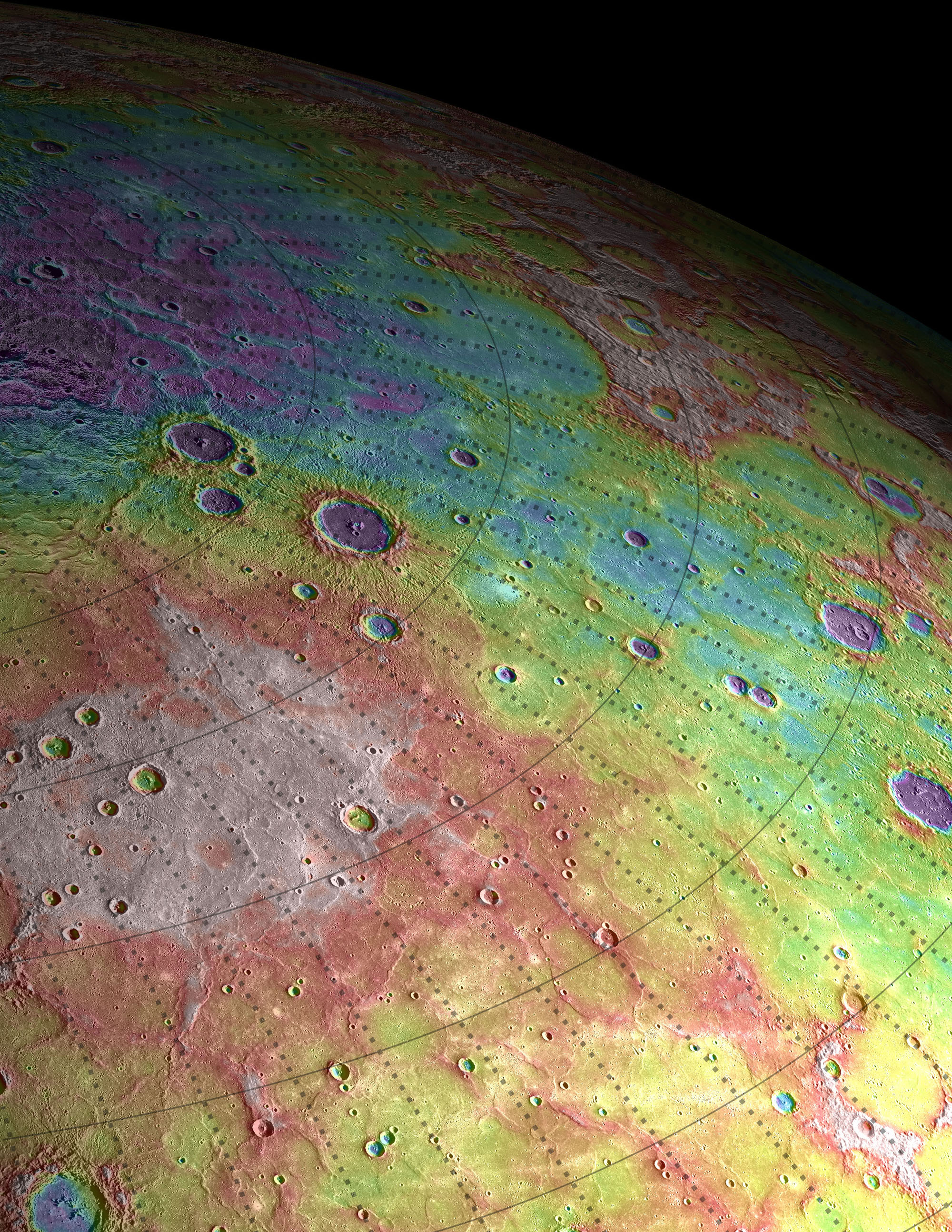
Strauss is near the center of this projection of part of the northern hemisphere of Mercury showing topography (red is high and blue is low)

Strauss is a crater on Mercury. Its name was adopted by the International Astronomical Union in 2019, after the Strauss family of musicians.

The crater Strauss is located southeast of Stieglitz, and is within Borealis Planitia.
