= Myron (crater) =

Crater on Mercury

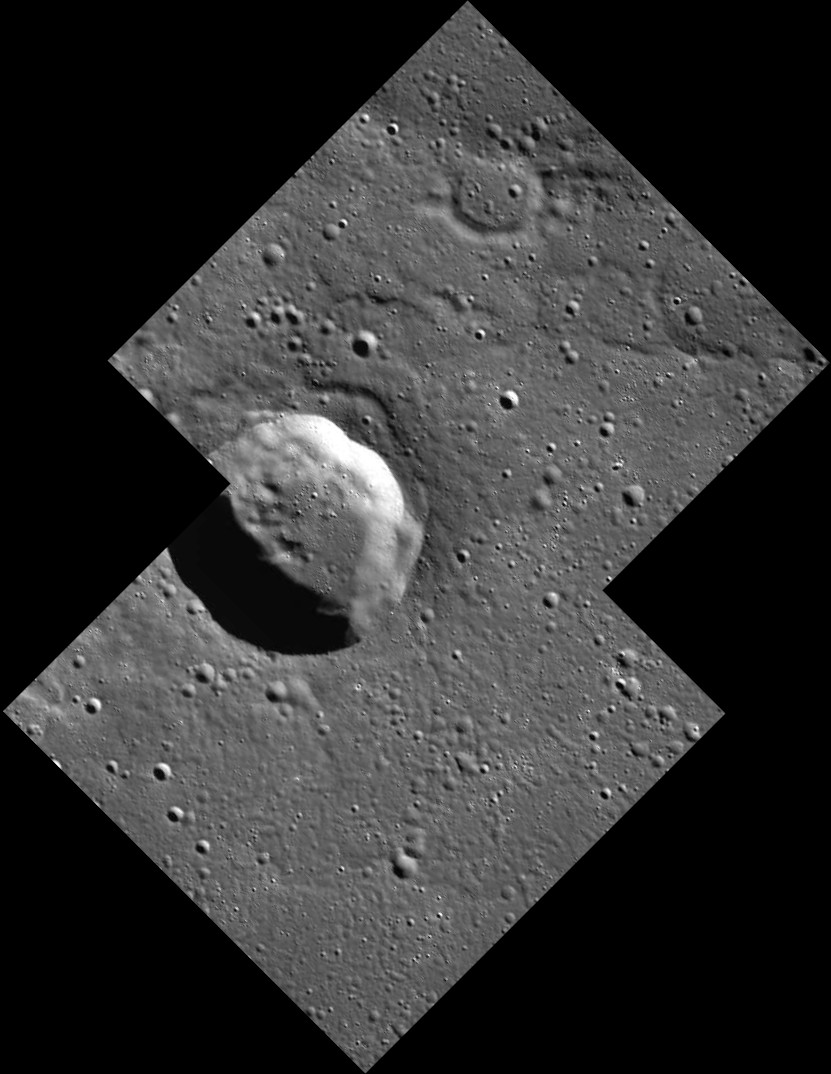
- MESSENGER WAC mosaic of Myron
- Feature type: Impact crater
- Location: Borealis quadrangle, Mercury
- Coordinates: 70.9°N 79.3°W
- Diameter: 31 km (19 mi)
- Eponym: Myron

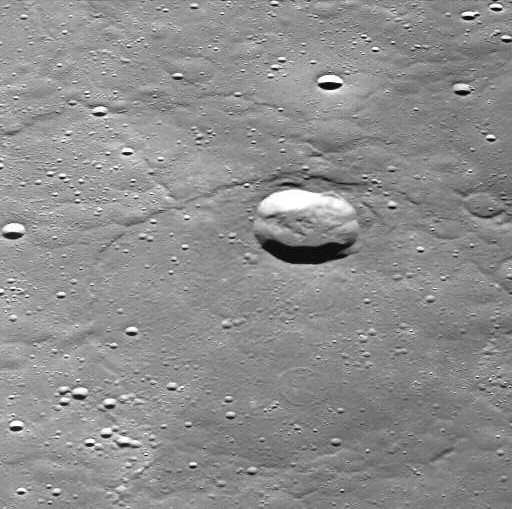
Oblique view

Myron is a crater on Mercury. It has a diameter of 31 kilometers. Its name was adopted by the International Astronomical Union in 1979. Myron is named for the ancient Greek sculptor Myron, who lived from 480 to 440 BCE.

Myron is within the vast Borealis Planitia. The closest named feature is the crater Monteverdi to the south.
