= Stieglitz (crater) =

Crater on Mercury

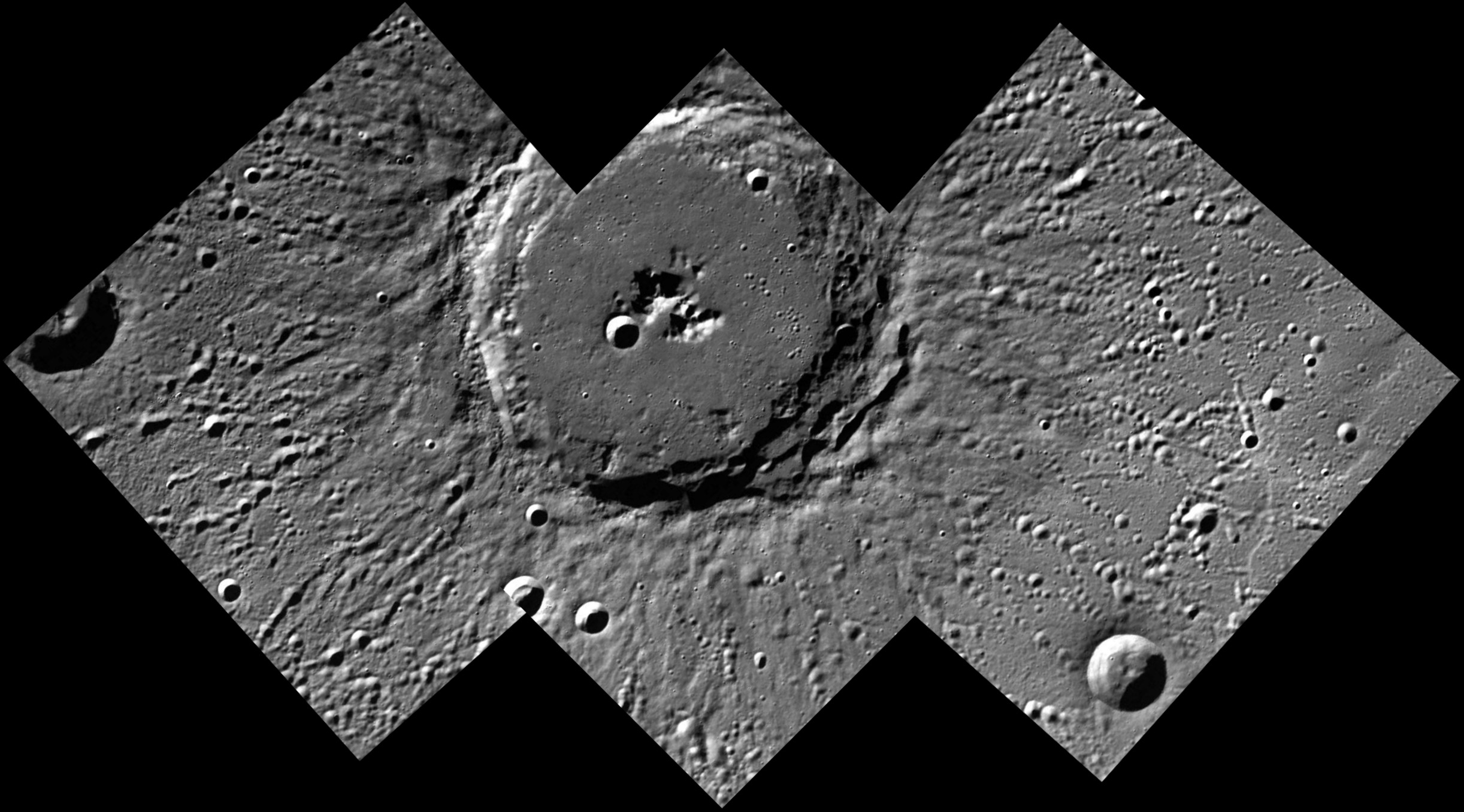
- Mosaic of MESSENGER WAC images
- Planet: Mercury
- Coordinates: 72.54°N 292.37°W
- Quadrangle: Borealis
- Diameter: 100 km (62 mi)
- Eponym: Alfred Stieglitz

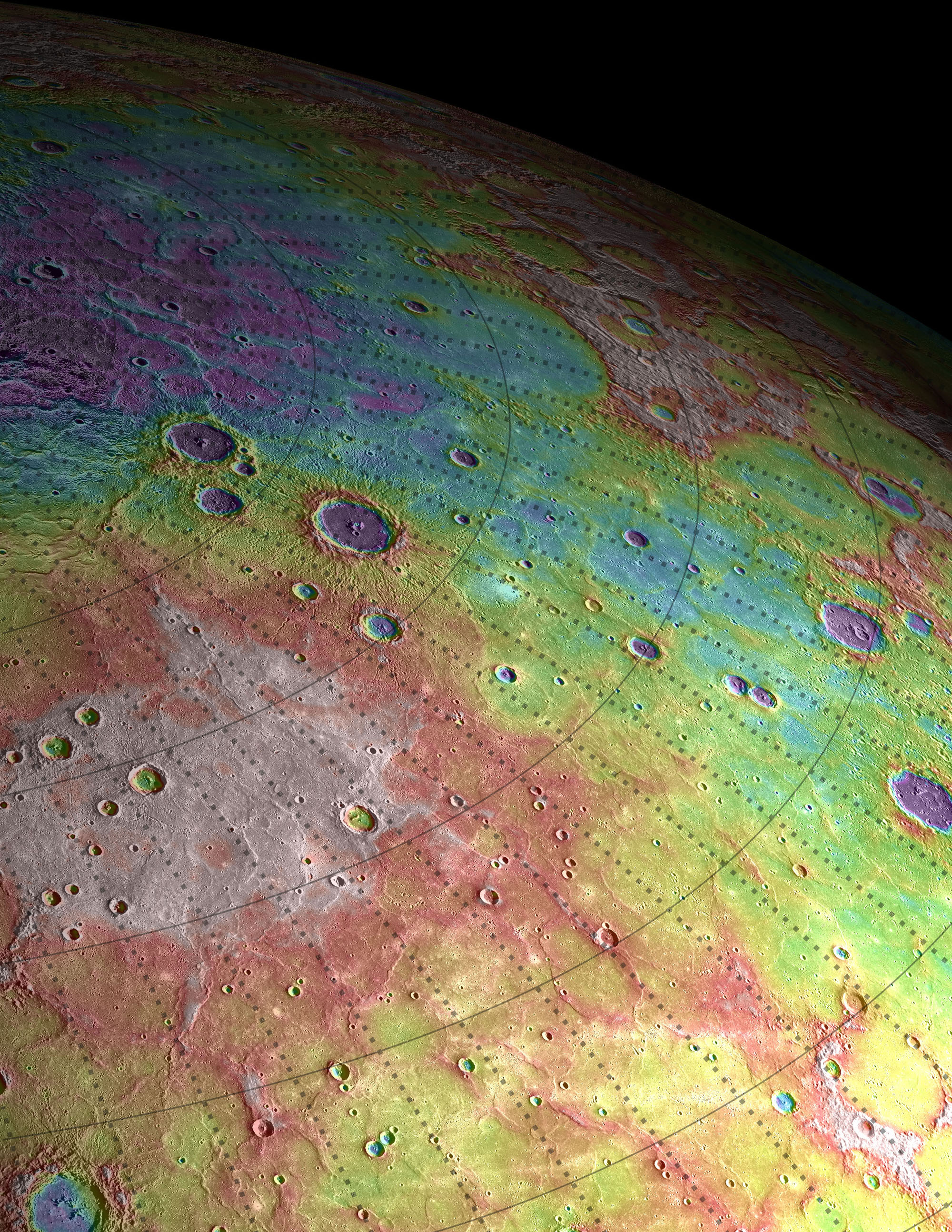
Stieglitz is left of the center of this projection of part of the northern hemisphere of Mercury showing topography (red is high and blue is low)

Stieglitz is a crater on Mercury. Its name was adopted by the International Astronomical Union in 2012, after the American photographer Alfred Stieglitz.

Stieglitz is a complex crater, having a central peak.

The crater is within Borealis Planitia. The crater Gaudí is due north of Stieglitz, and Strauss is to the southeast.

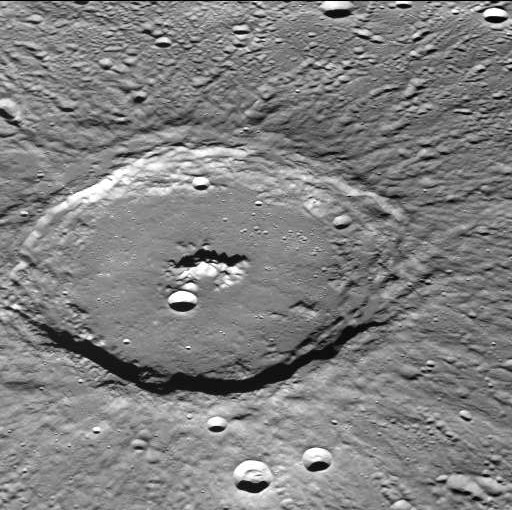
Oblique view of Stieglitz crater
