= Gaudí (crater) =

Crater on Mercury

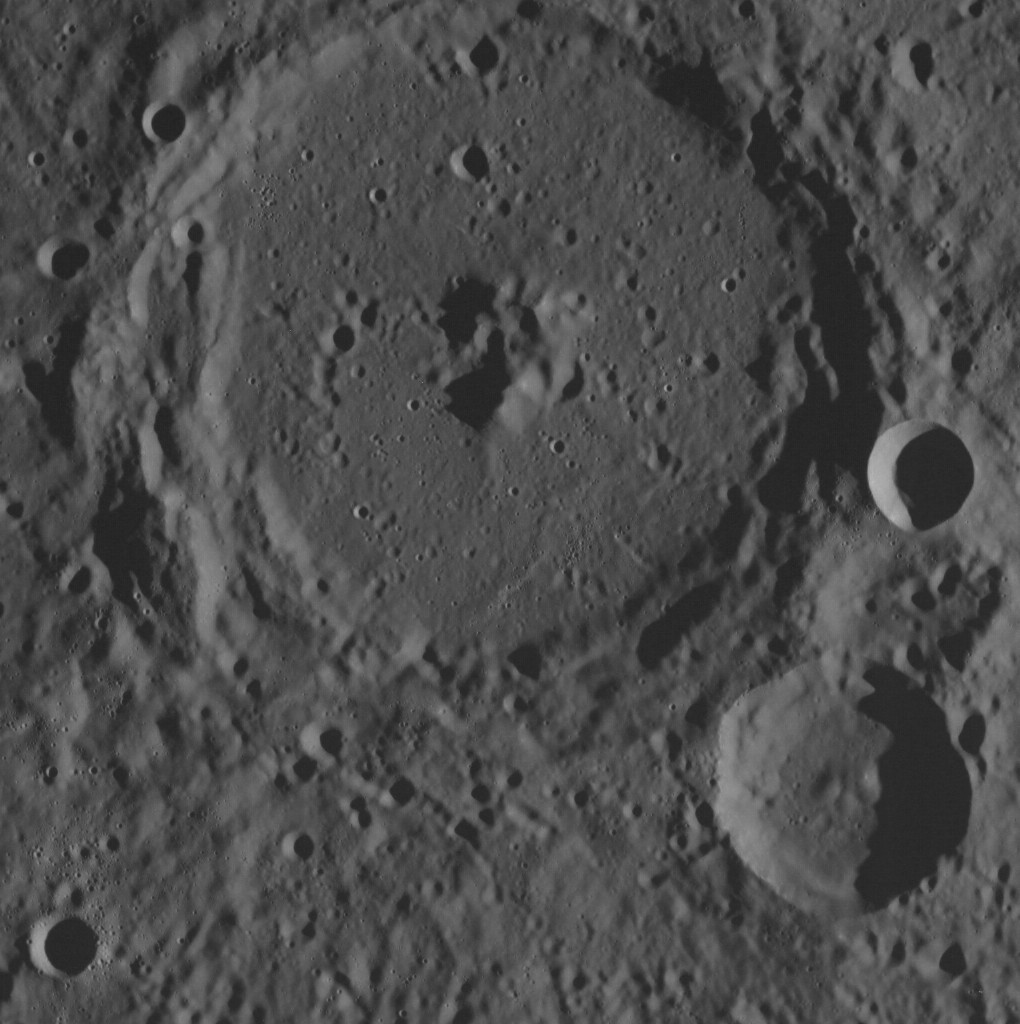
- MESSENGER WAC image
- Planet: Mercury
- Coordinates: 76.9°N 290.84°W
- Quadrangle: Borealis
- Diameter: 81 km
- Eponym: Antoni Gaudí

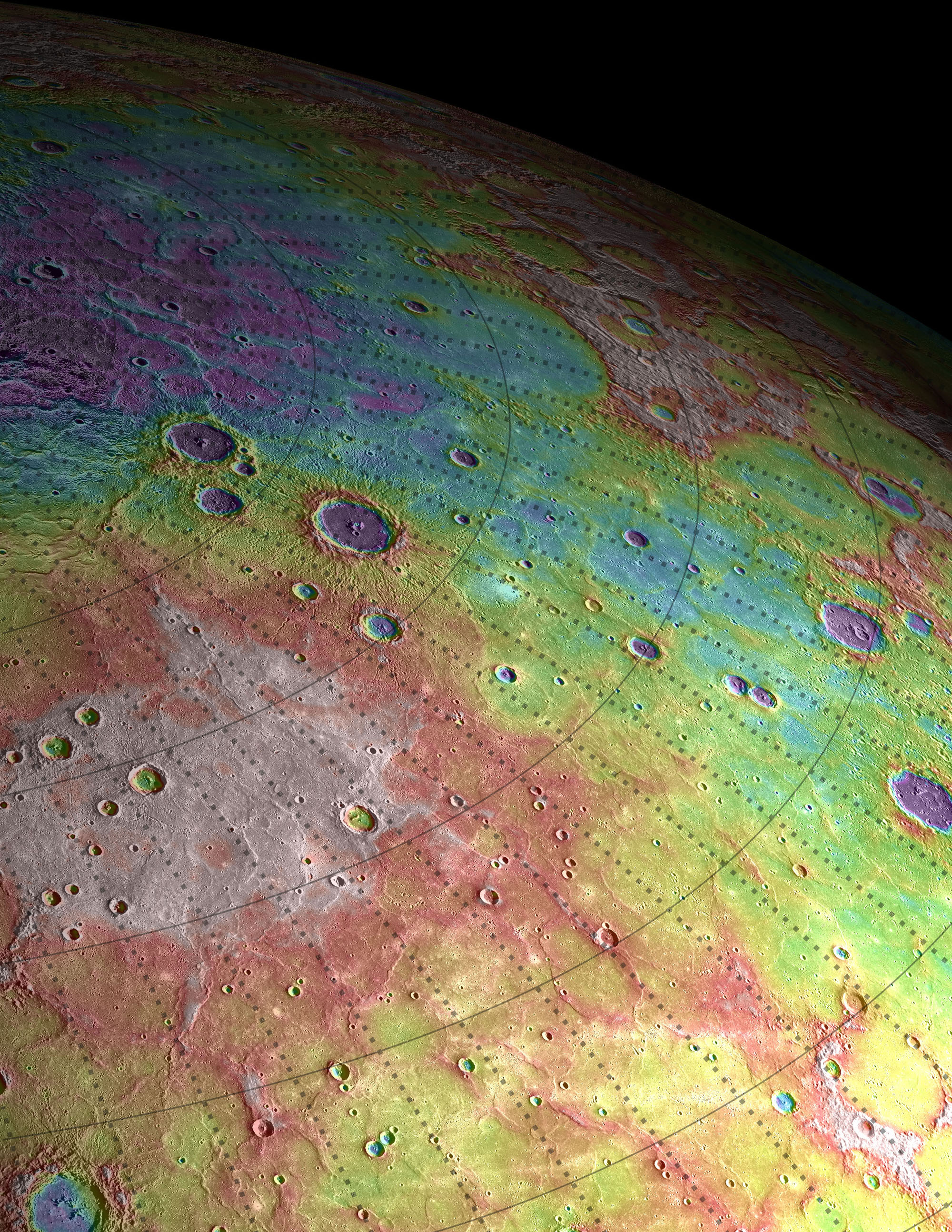
Gaudí is left of the center of this projection of part of the northern hemisphere of Mercury showing topography (red is high and blue is low)

Gaudí is a crater on Mercury. Its name was adopted by the International Astronomical Union in 2012, after the Spanish Catalan architect Antoni Gaudí.

The crater is within Borealis Planitia. The larger crater Stieglitz is due south of Gaudí.

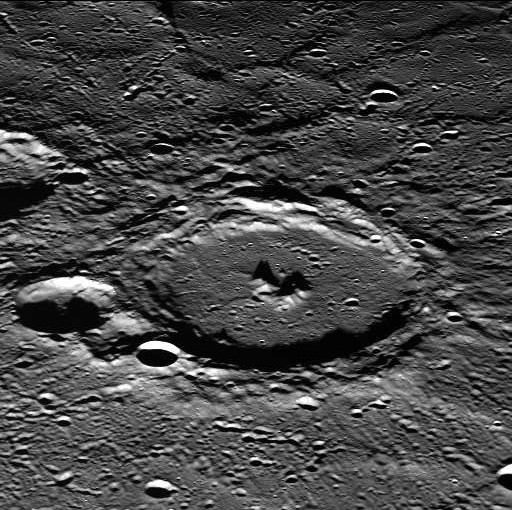
Oblique view of Gaudí crater
