= Sholem Aleichem (crater) =

Crater on Mercury

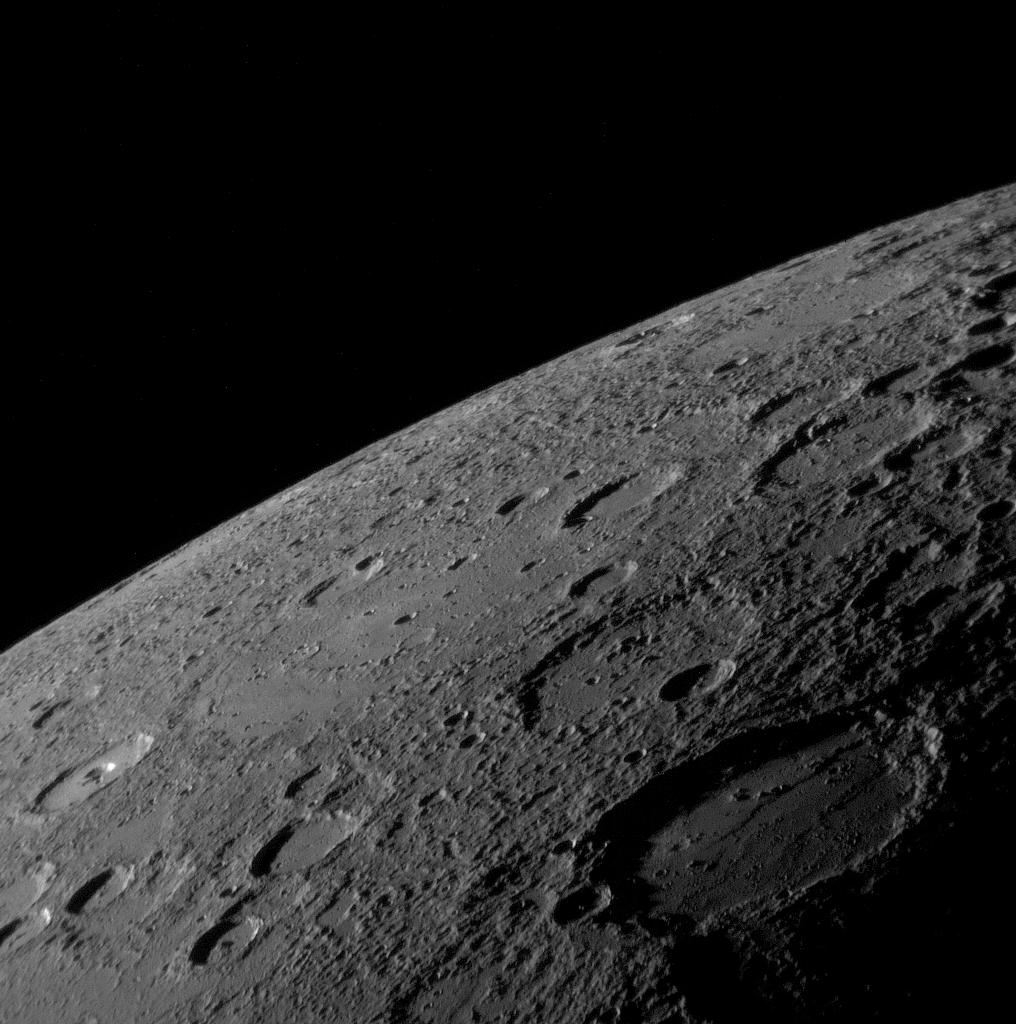
- MESSENGER photo of Sholem Aleichem in lower right foreground
- Feature type: Impact crater
- Location: Victoria quadrangle, Mercury
- Coordinates: 50.92°N 90.48°W
- Diameter: 196.0 km (121.8 mi)
- Eponym: Sholom Aleichem

Sholem Aleichem is a crater on Mercury, named after the Yiddish writer Sholem Aleichem in 1979. The crater was first imaged by Mariner 10 in 1974.

The inter-crater plain deposits have been deformed by linear ridges.

Adjacent to the Sholem Aleichem crater to the southeast is the older and larger Vyāsa crater. Further to the east is Stravinsky. To the south and southeast are the similarly sized Al-Hamadhani and Scarlatti. To the west is Halim. To the northwest is Al-Akhtal.

== Hollows ==
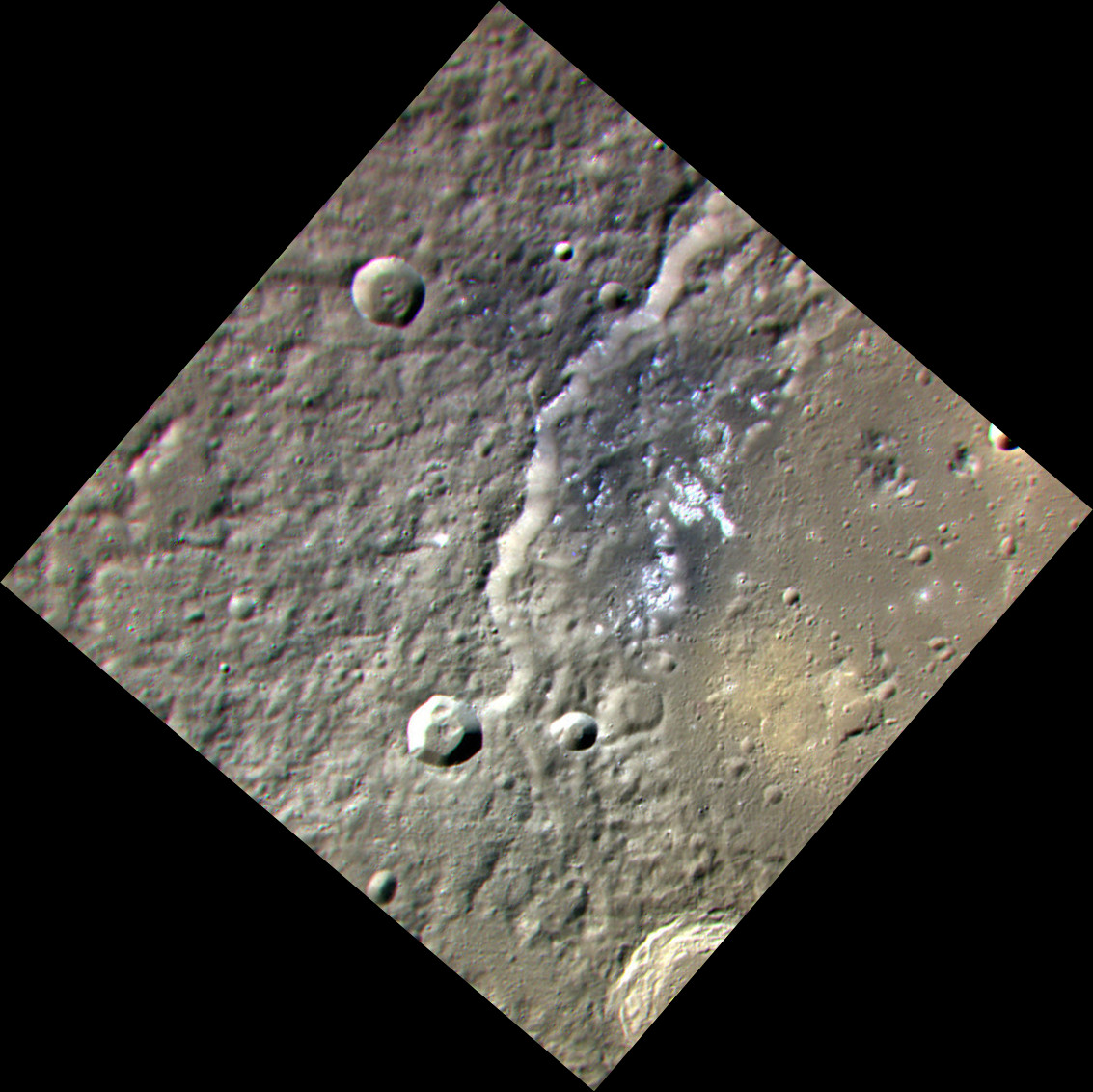
Approximate color image of western Sholem Aleichem crater, showing the hollows as white patches

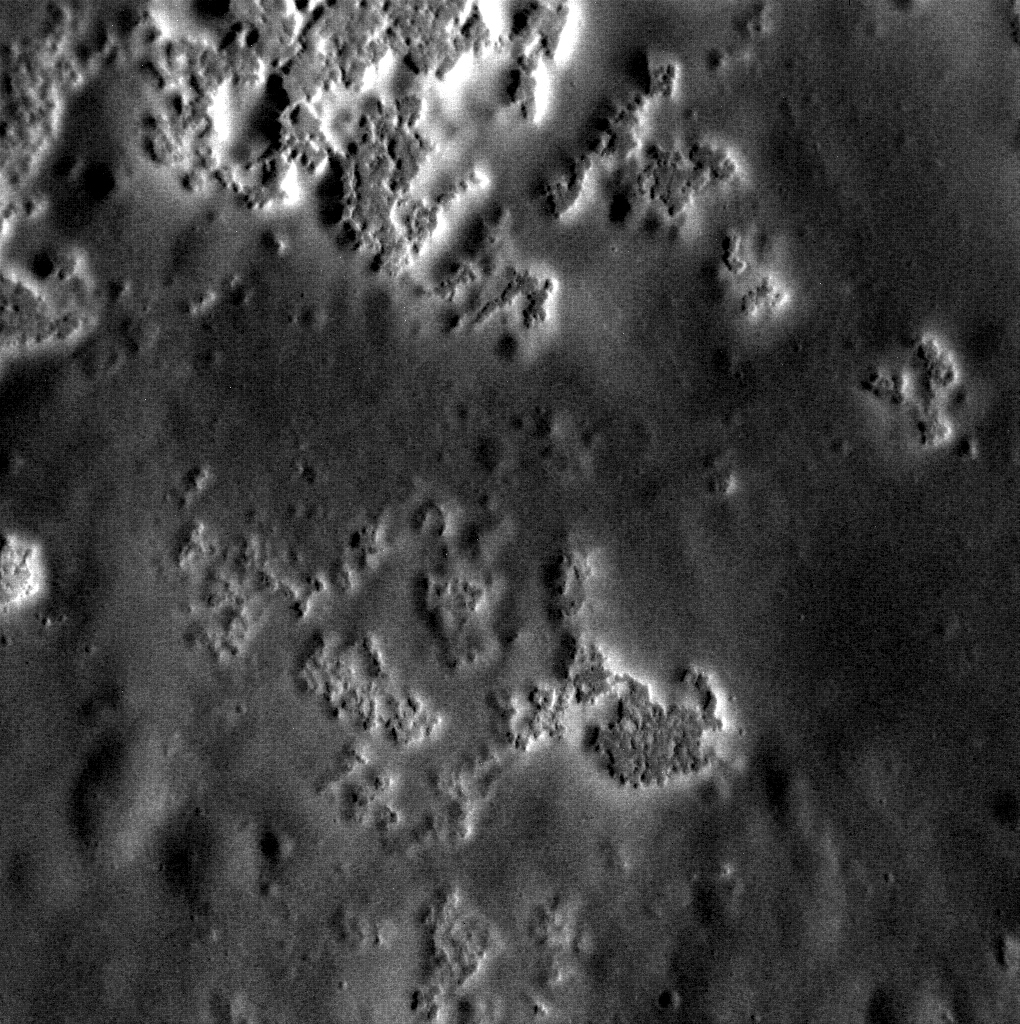
MESSENGER image of hollows within Sholem Aleichem.

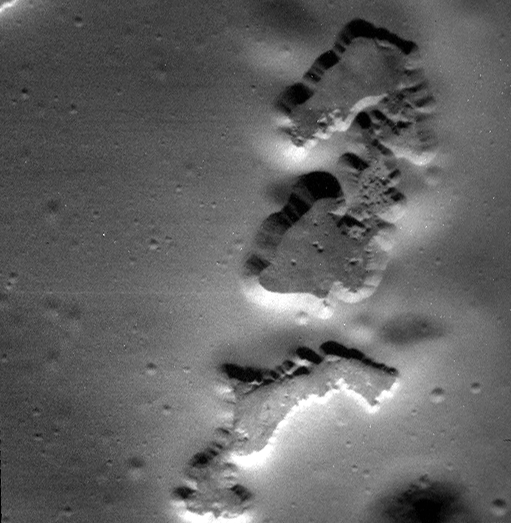
Very high-resolution image of hollows within Sholem Aleichem. Width is approximately 1.5 kilometers.
