= Rubens (crater) =

Crater on Mercury

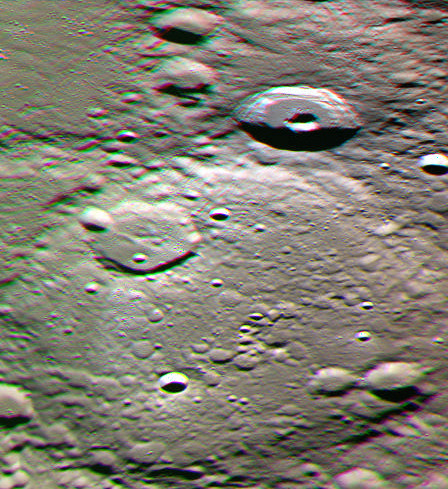
- Oblique MESSENGER WAC image
- Planet: Mercury
- Coordinates: 60.58°N 77.99°W
- Quadrangle: Victoria
- Diameter: 158 km (98 mi)
- Eponym: Peter Paul Rubens

Rubens is a crater on Mercury. Its name was adopted by the International Astronomical Union (IAU) in 1979, after Flemish painter Peter Paul Rubens. The crater was first imaged by Mariner 10 in 1974.

The crater Monteverdi is to the north of Rubens. Stravinsky is to the south and Duccio is to the east.
