= Botticelli (crater) =

Crater on Mercury

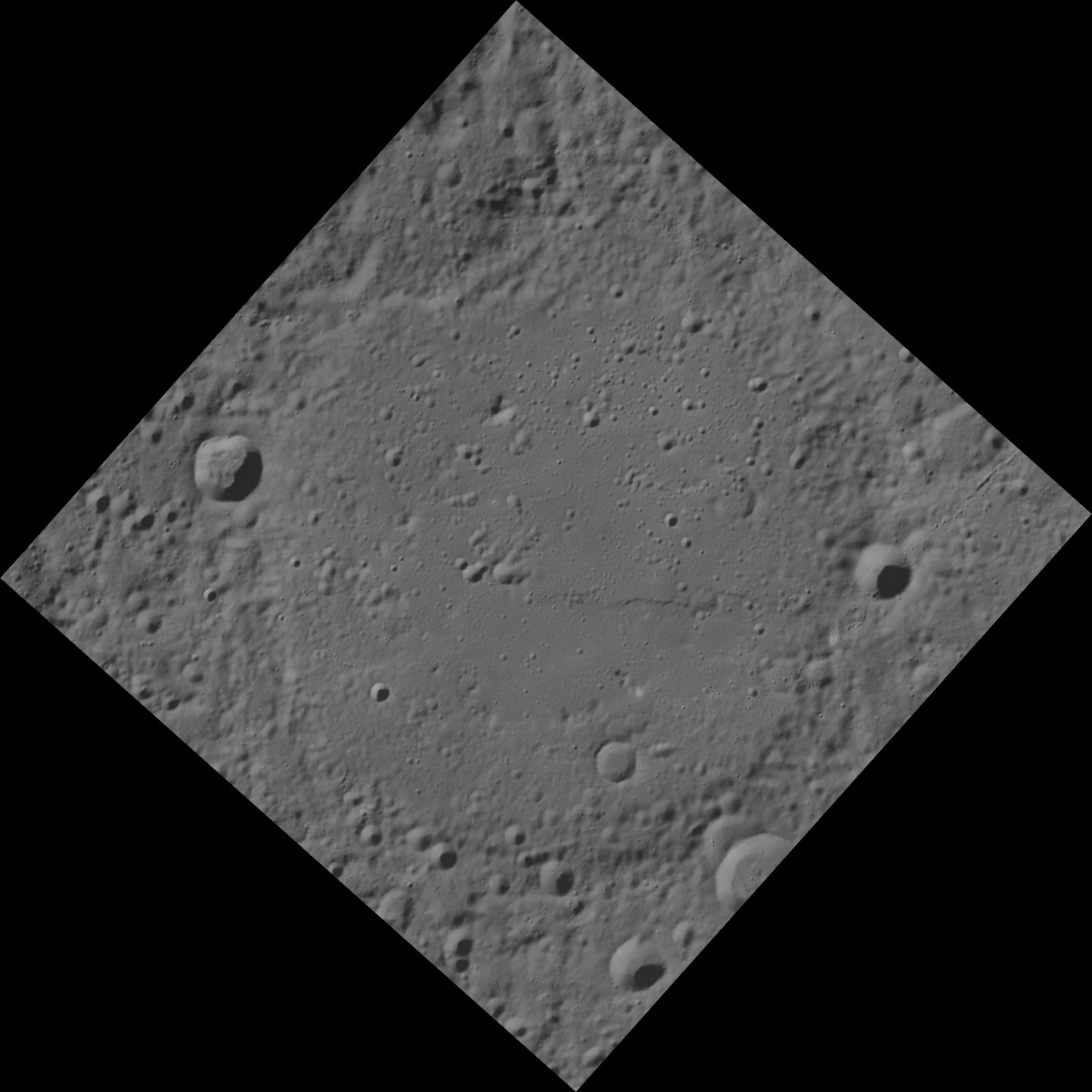
- MESSENGER WAC image of Botticelli
- Feature type: Peak-ring impact basin
- Location: Shakespeare quadrangle, Mercury
- Coordinates: 63.63°N 112.35°W
- Diameter: 136.35 kilometres (84.72 mi)
- Eponym: Sandro Botticelli

Botticelli is a crater on Mercury. It has a diameter of 136.35 kilometres (84.72 mi). Its name was adopted by the International Astronomical Union (IAU) in 1979. Botticelli is named for the Italian painter Sandro Botticelli, who lived from 1445 to 1510. The crater was first imaged by Mariner 10 in 1974.

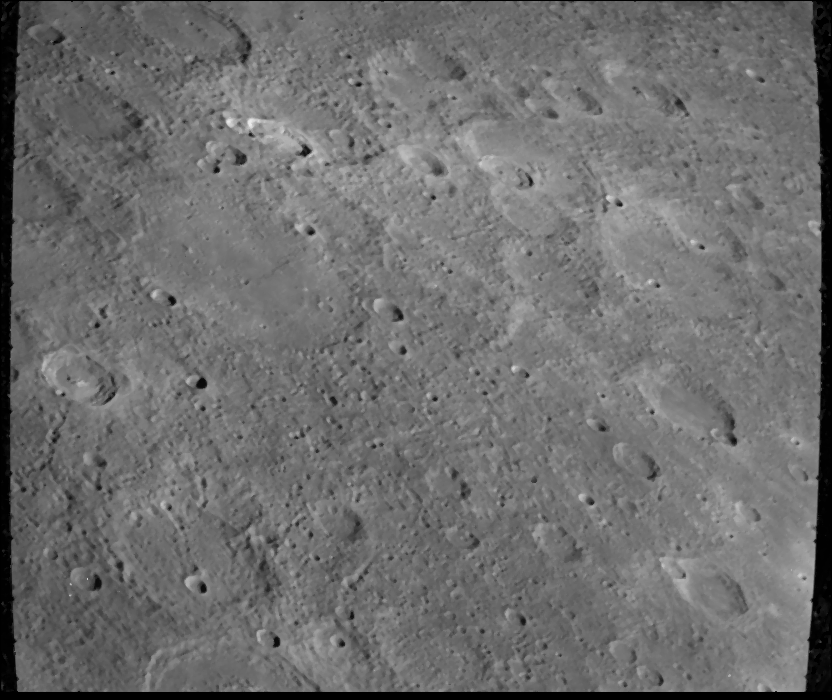
Mariner 10 image 149, from the first flyby on 25 March 1974, showing Botticelli in upper left and Al-Akhtal in upper right

Botticelli is one of 110 peak ring basins on Mercury, although its ring is nearly eroded away or flooded by lava.
