= Al-Akhtal (crater) =

Crater on Mercury

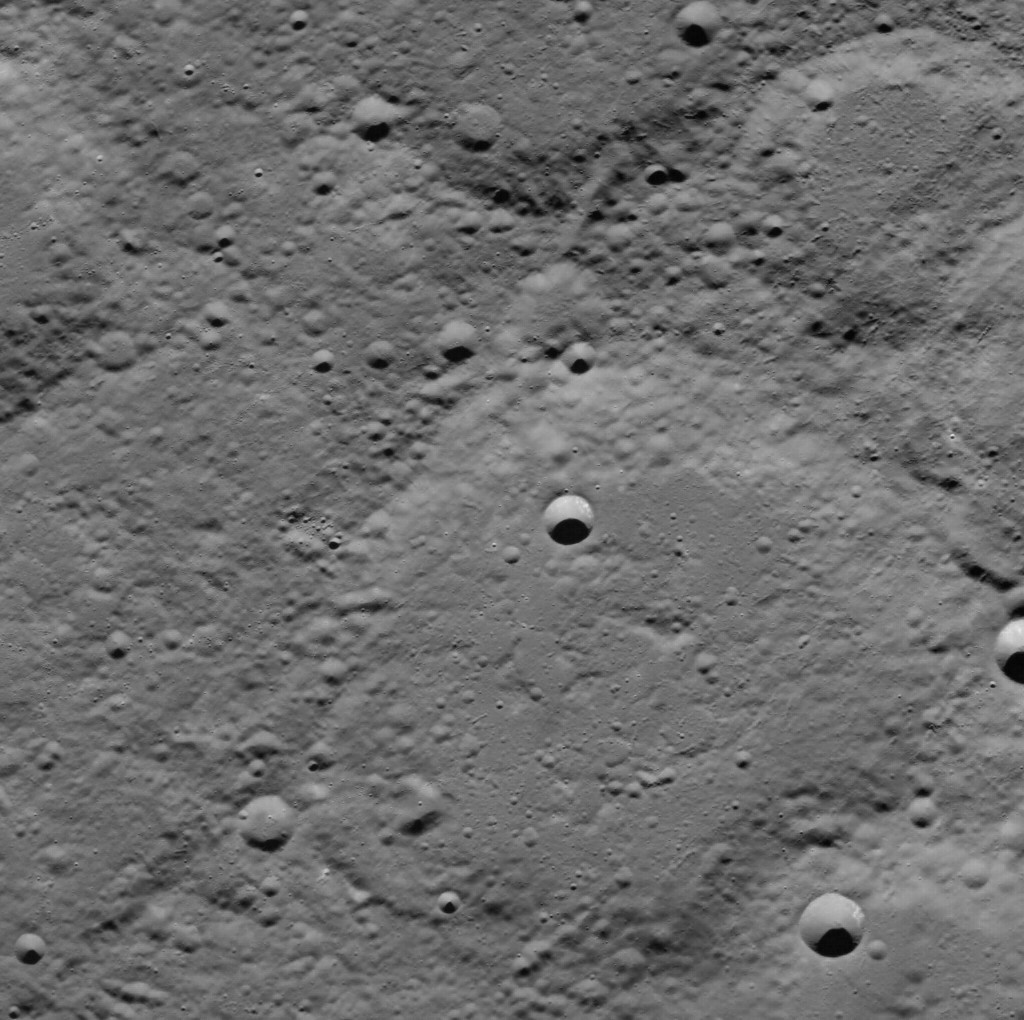
- MESSENGER WAC image of Al-Akhtal
- Feature type: Impact crater
- Location: Shakespeare quadrangle, Mercury
- Coordinates: 59.38°N 99.71°W
- Diameter: 94.3 km (58.6 mi)
- Eponym: Akhtal

Al-Akhtal is a crater on Mercury. Its name was adopted by the International Astronomical Union (IAU) in 1985. Al-Akhtal is named for the Arab poet Akhtal, who lived from 640 to 710 C.E. The crater was first imaged by Mariner 10 in 1974.

To the southeast of Al-Akhtal is Sholem Aleichem crater. To the northwest is Botticelli.

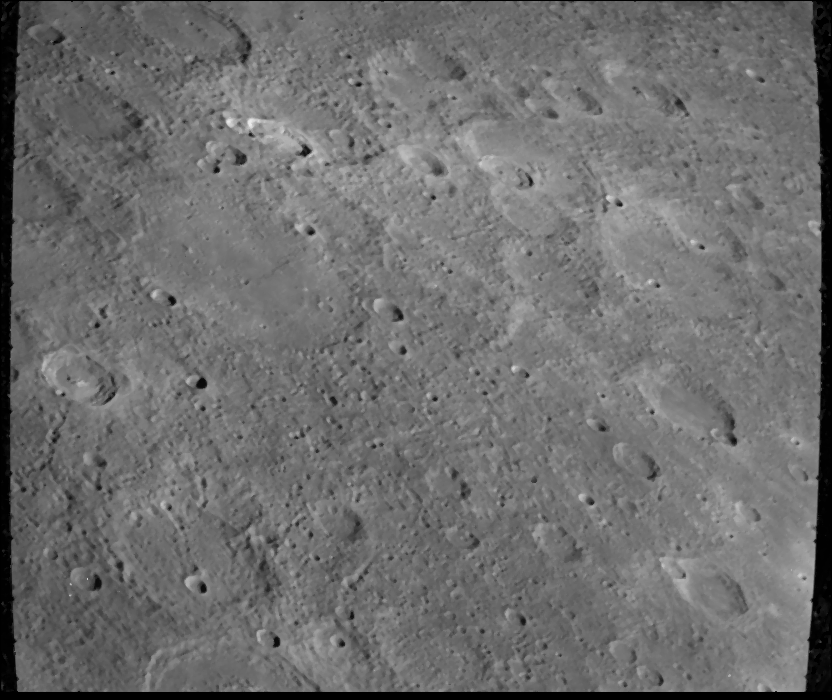
Mariner 10 image 149, from the first flyby on 25 March 1974, showing Botticelli in upper left and Al-Akhtal in upper right
