= Myron (disambiguation) =

Myron was Athenian sculptor from the mid-5th century BC.

Myron may also refer to:

== People ==
- Myron (given name), a masculine given name
- Saint Myron, archbishop of Crete, ~250-350

== Arts and entertainment ==
- Myron (duo), Swiss music band with Manu-L as vocalist
- Myron (novel), a novel by Gore Vidal
- Myron, a plasticine character in the 1998-2001 TV series The Micallef P(r)ogram(me)
- "Myron" (song), a single released by Lil Uzi Vert in 2020
- Myron Mako, the main protagonist of the 2008 strategy game Robocalypse

== Others ==
- 4752 Myron, a main-belt asteroid
- Myron (crater), a crater on Mercury
- Myron (chrism), a holy oil used for anointing in the Eastern Orthodox churches
- Darapsa myron, a moth of the family Sphingidae
- SS Myron, a steamboat built in 1888
- Myron (snake), a genus of snakes
