= Halim (crater) =

Crater on Mercury

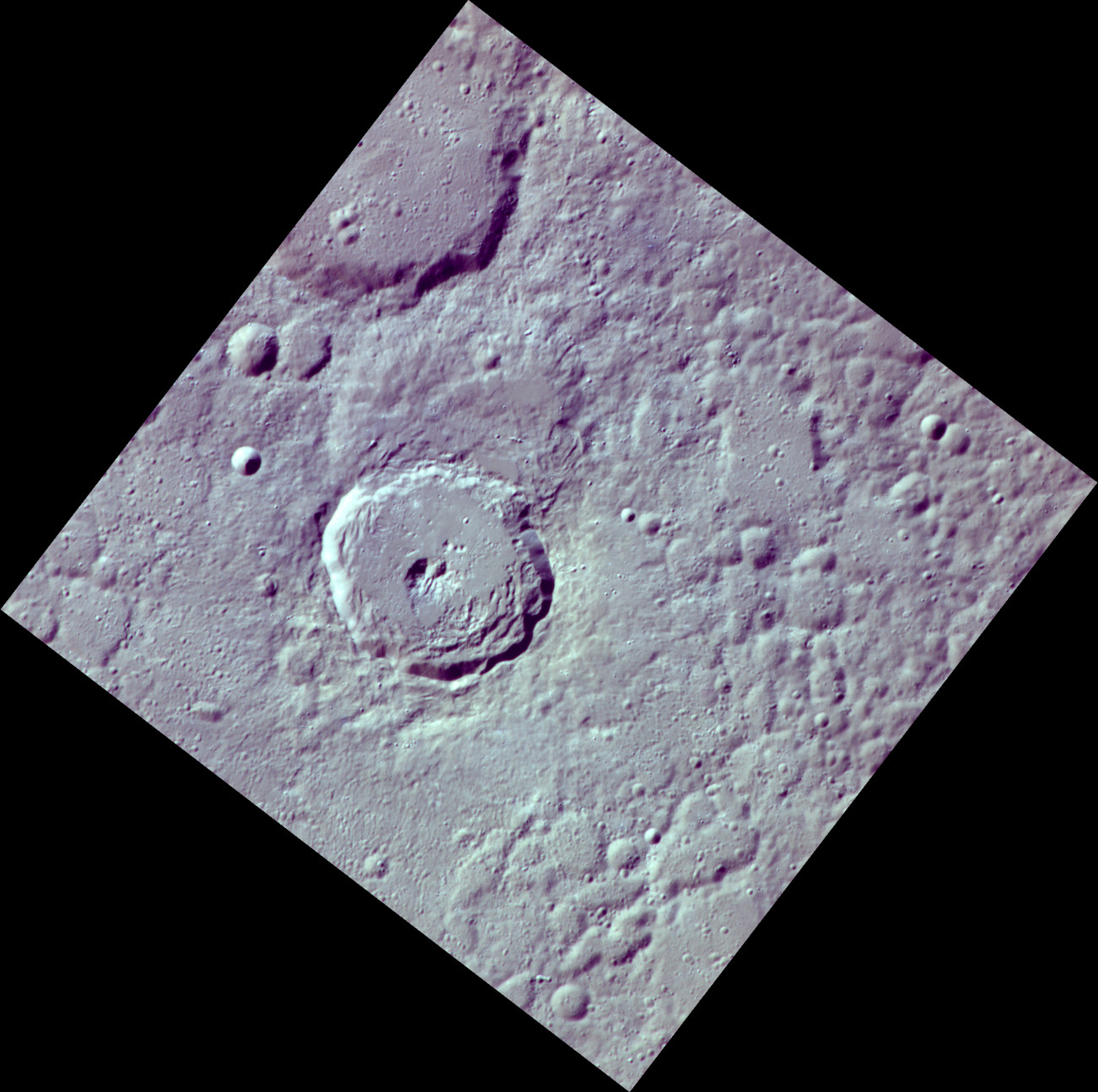
- Exaggerated color image from MESSENGER WAC
- Planet: Mercury
- Coordinates: 48.87°N 100.94°W
- Quadrangle: Shakespeare
- Diameter: 44.0 km (27.3 mi)
- Eponym: Tahia Halim

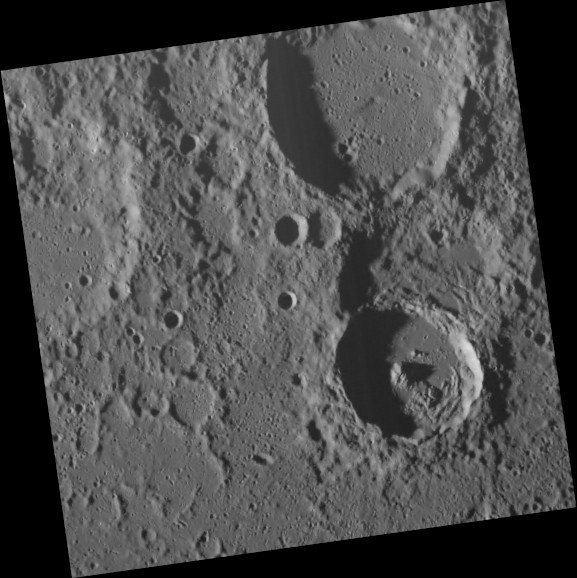
Halim at low sun angle

Halim is a crater on Mercury. Its name was adopted by the International Astronomical Union (IAU) on November 14, 2024. The crater is named for Egyptian painter Tahia Halim.

Halim lies between Sholem Aleichem and Bruegel craters to the east and west. It is north of Scarlatti.
