= Vyāsa (crater) =

Crater on Mercury

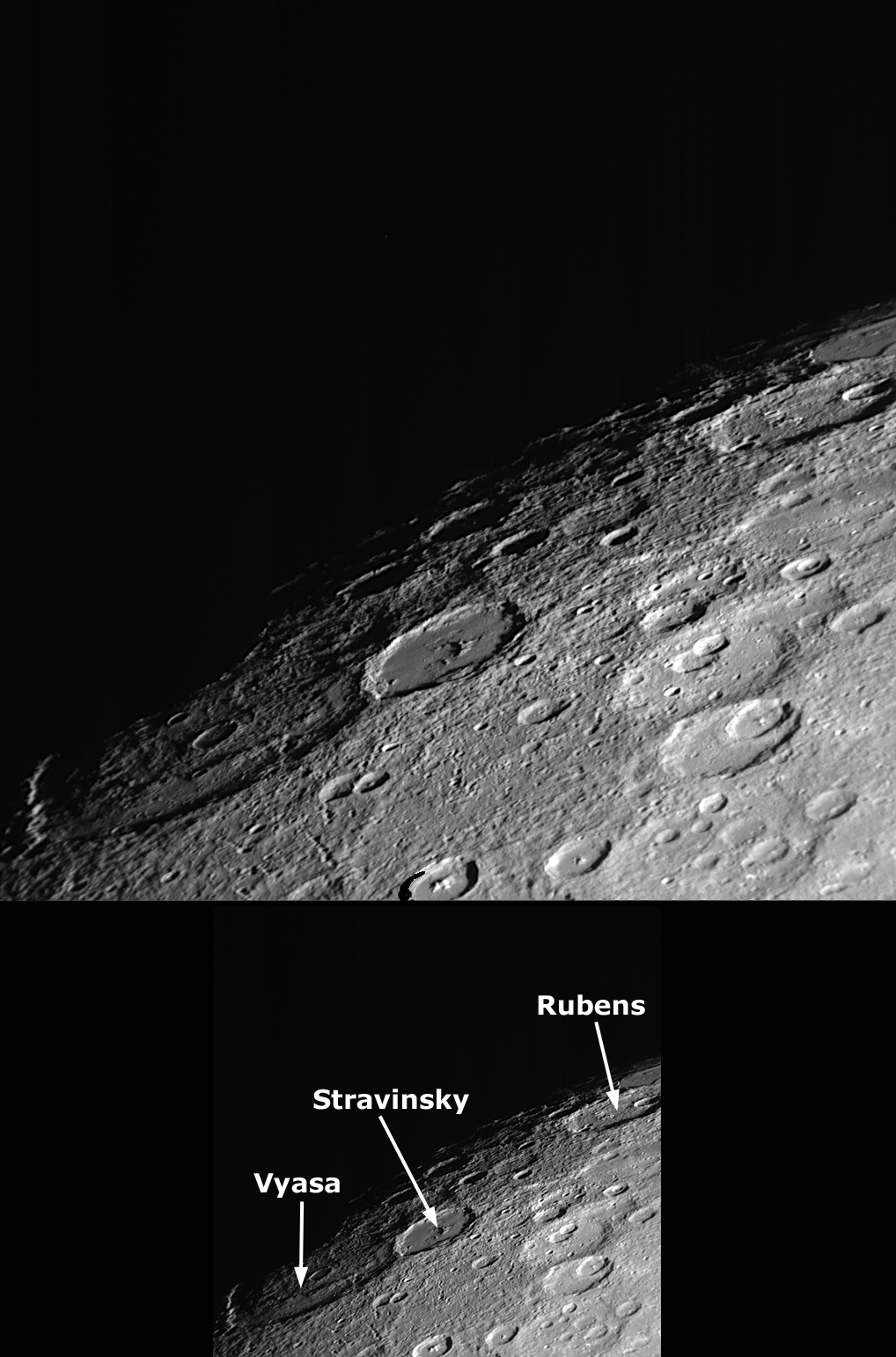
- Feature type: Impact crater
- Location: Victoria quadrangle, Mercury
- Coordinates: 43.5°N 80°W
- Diameter: 275 km (171 mi)
- Eponym: Vyasa

Vyāsa is a crater on Mercury. It was named by the IAU in 1979, after the Hindu poet Vyasa. The crater was first imaged by Mariner 10 in 1974.

Vyāsa is Tolstojan in age. It is overlain by two much younger craters – Stravinsky and Sholem Aleichem.

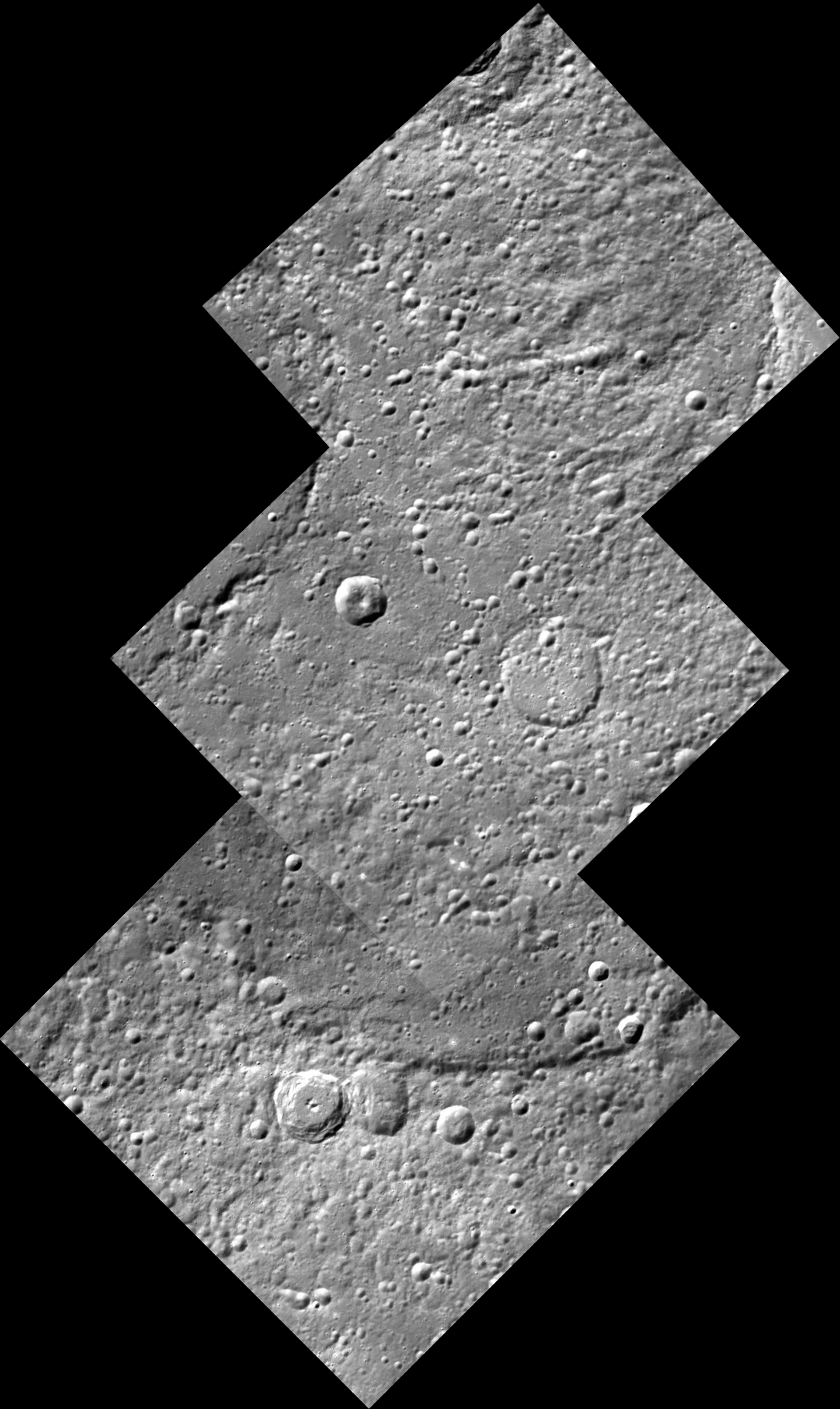
Central Vyāsa crater
