= Monteverdi (crater) =

Crater on Mercury

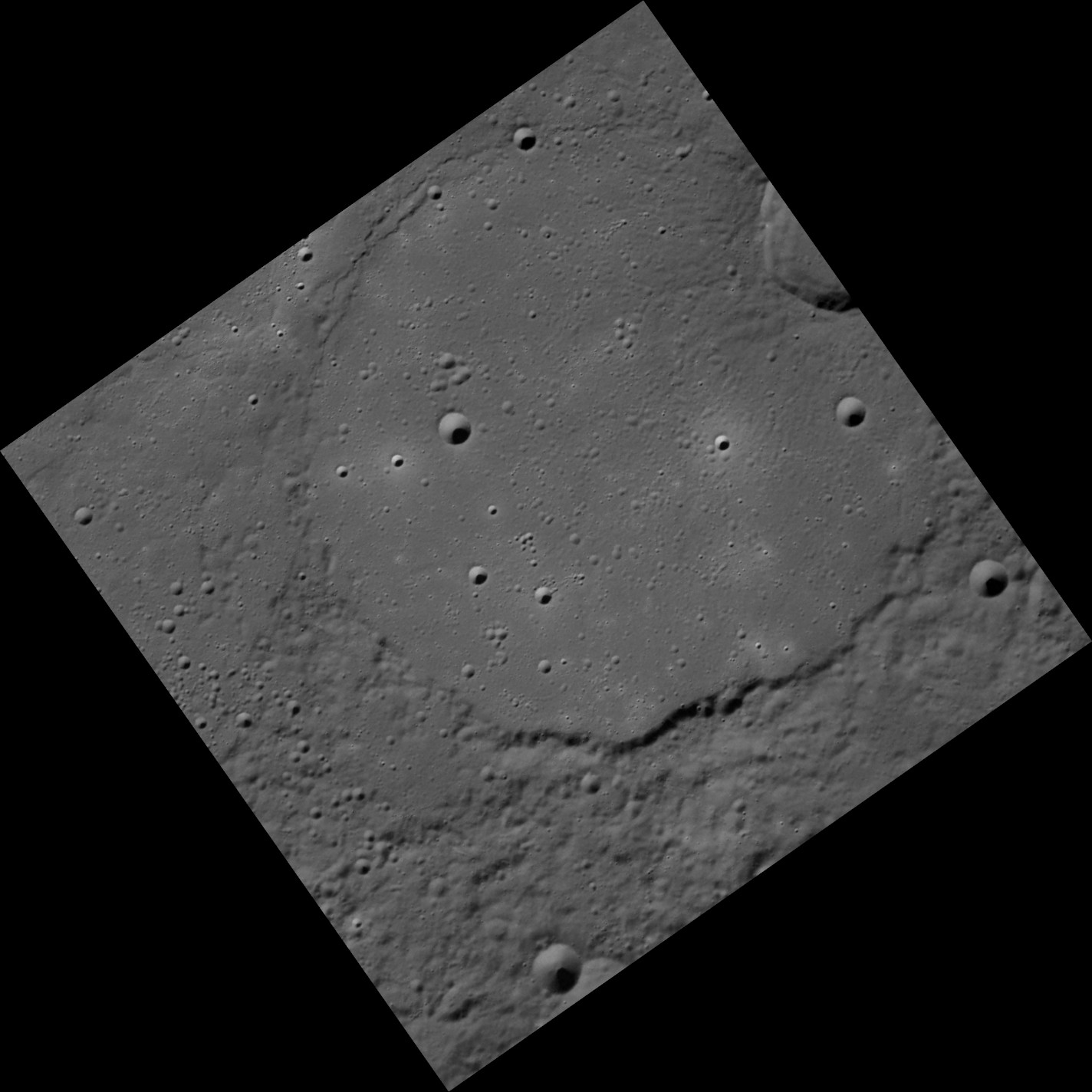
- MESSENGER WAC image of Monteverdi
- Feature type: Impact crater
- Location: Victoria quadrangle, Mercury
- Coordinates: 63.8°N 77.3°W
- Diameter: 138 km (86 mi)
- Eponym: Claudio Monteverdi

Monteverdi is a crater on Mercury with a diameter of 138 kilometers. Its name was adopted by the International Astronomical Union (IAU) in 1979, from the Italian composer Claudio Monteverdi, a crucial transitional figure between Renaissance and Baroque music. It is on the southern margin of Borealis Planitia, north of Rubens. The crater was first imaged by Mariner 10 in 1974.
