= Myro of Rhodes =

Myro of Rhodes (Μυρώ ἡ Ῥοδία) was a philosopher mentioned in the Suda. Her dates are uncertain, but she was probably Hellenistic at the earliest.

She was known in the ancient world for her commonplace book which collects women's sayings. It has not survived.

The full text of her Suda entry:

Μυρώ, Ῥοδία, φιλόσοφος. χρείας γυναικῶν βασιλίδων καὶ μύθους.
A Rhodian woman, a philosopher. [Wrote] sayings of women who were queens, and stories.
