= Stravinsky (crater) =

Crater on Mercury

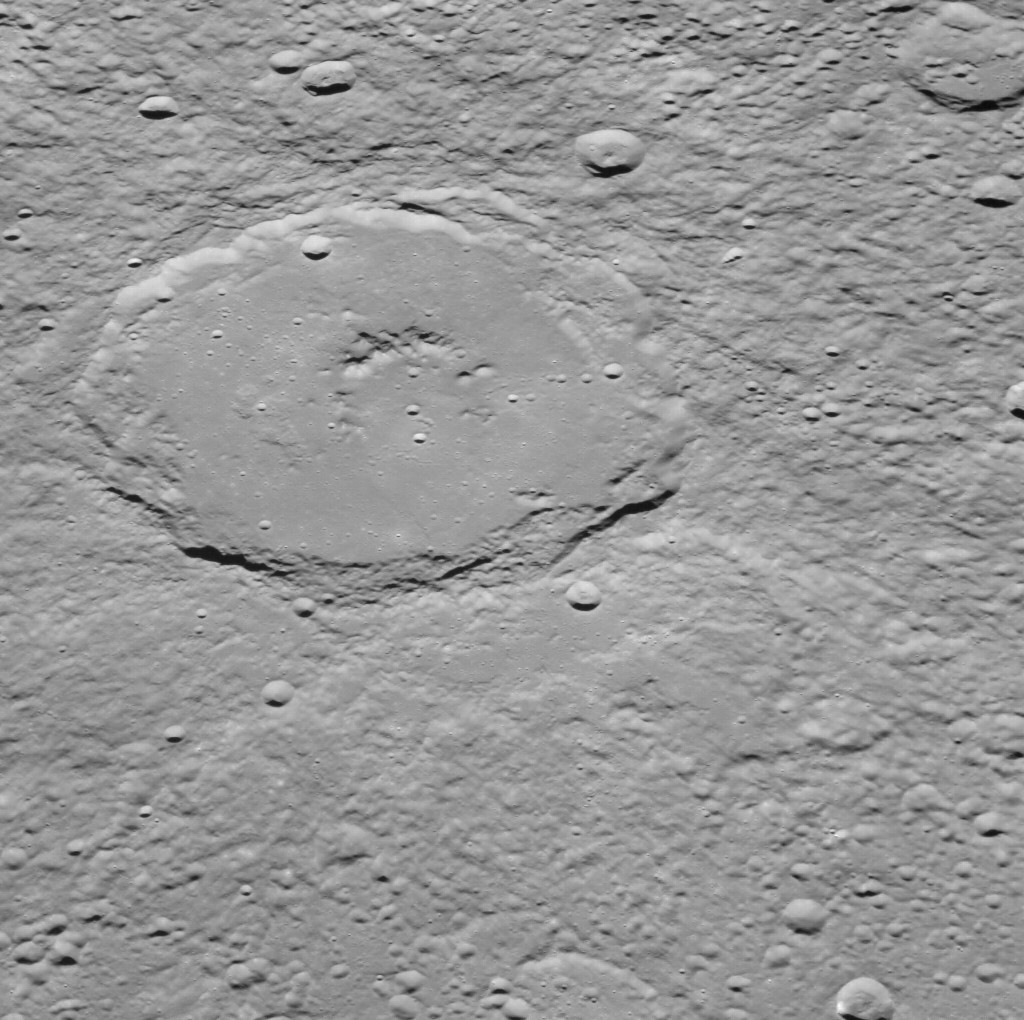
- Oblique MESSENGER WAC image
- Feature type: Central-peak impact crater
- Location: Victoria quadrangle, Mercury
- Coordinates: 50.5°N 73°W
- Diameter: 170 km (110 mi)
- Eponym: Igor Stravinsky

Stravinsky is a crater on Mercury. It overlays the rim of the much older Vyāsa crater. It was named by the IAU in 1979 for the influential Russian composer Igor Stravinsky. The crater was first imaged by Mariner 10 in 1974.

To the north of Stravinsky is the crater Rubens, and to the southwest is Vyāsa.

== Views ==
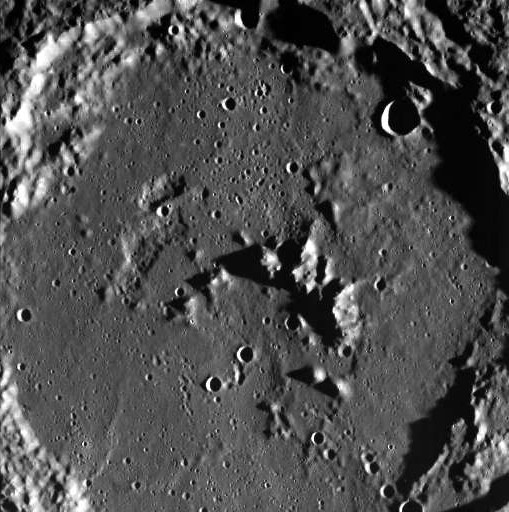
Detail of interior at low sun angle

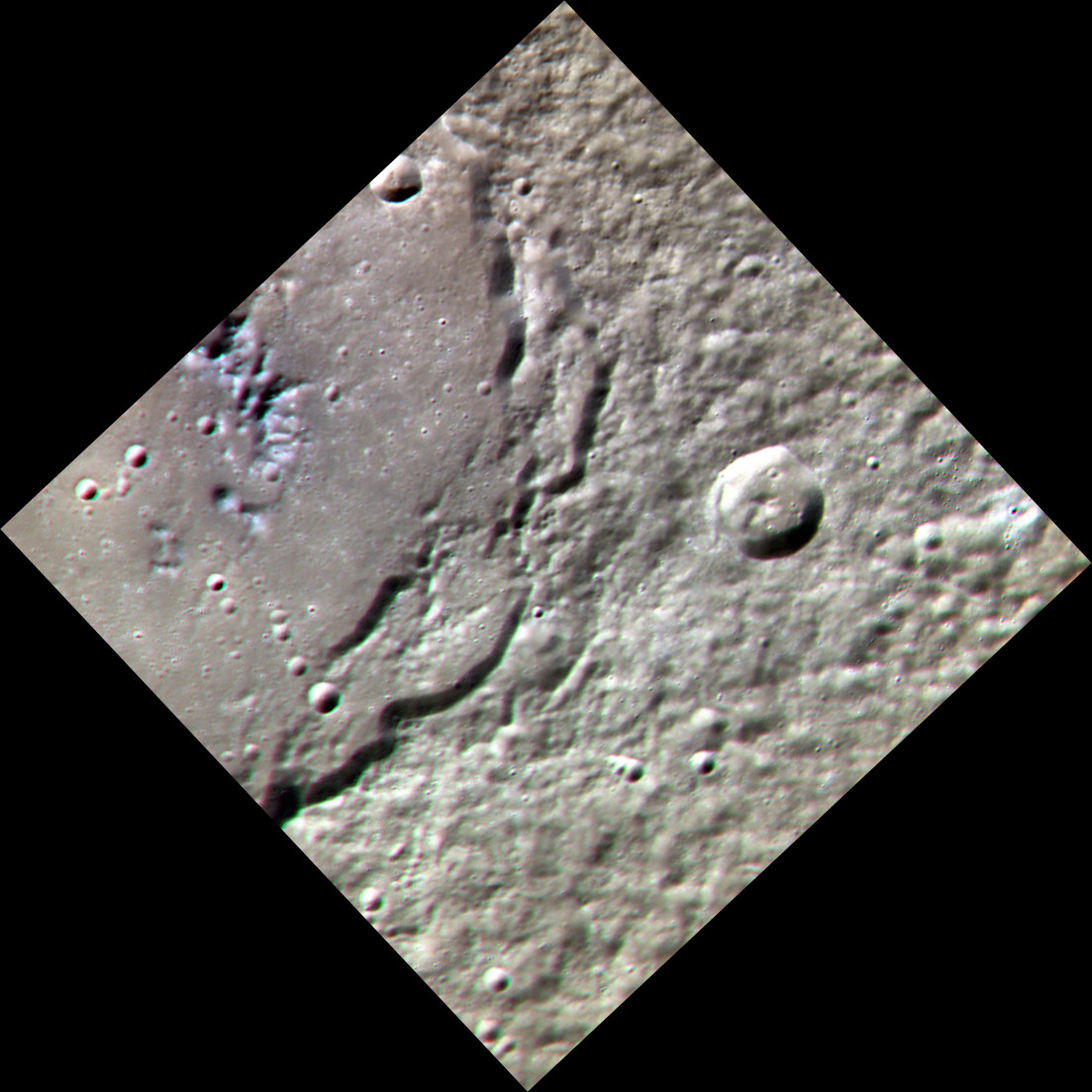
Approximate color image of eastern Stravinsky, showing bluish color of central peak
