= Borealis Planitia =

Plain on Mercury

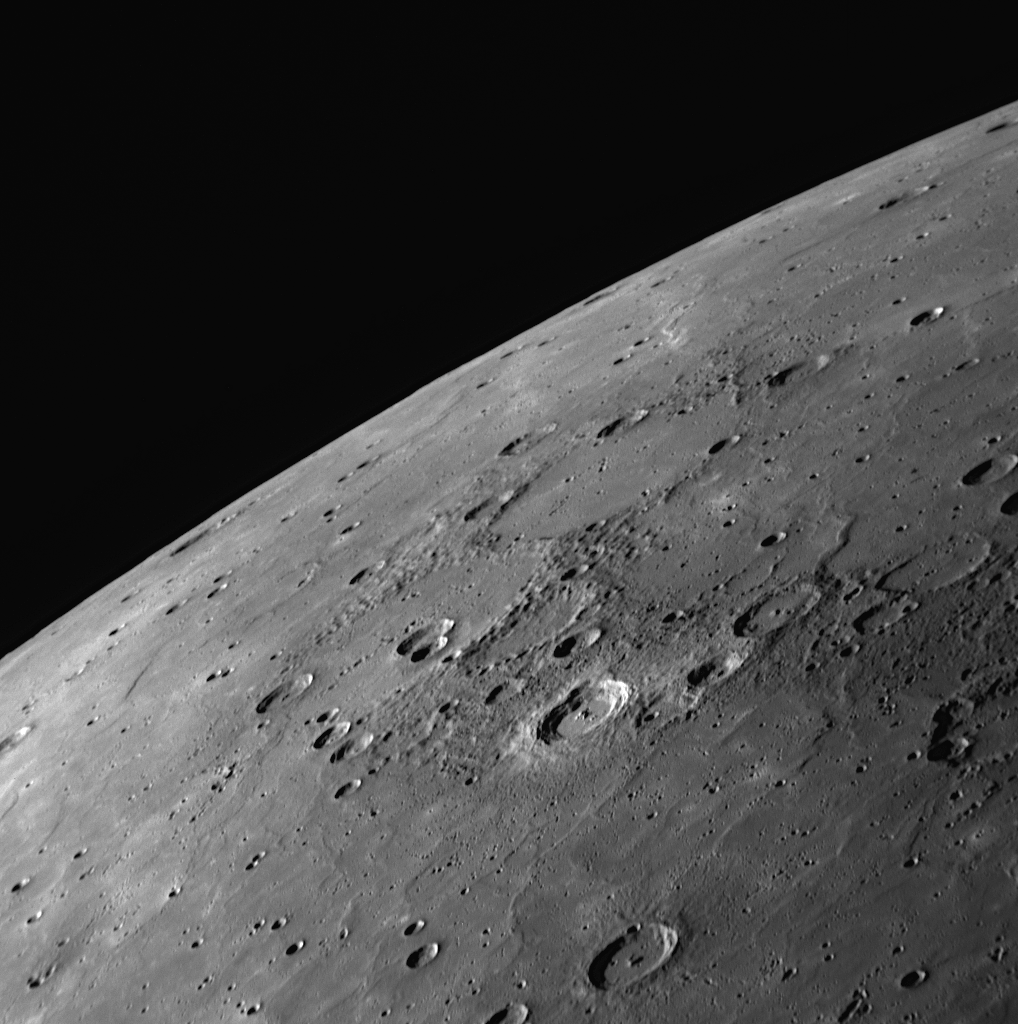
- Part of Borealis Planitia, photographed by MESSENGER
- Feature type: Planitia
- Location: Borealis quadrangle, Mercury
- Coordinates: 73.4°N 79.5°W
- Age: ~3.7 billion years
- Eponym: Latin for "Northern Plain"

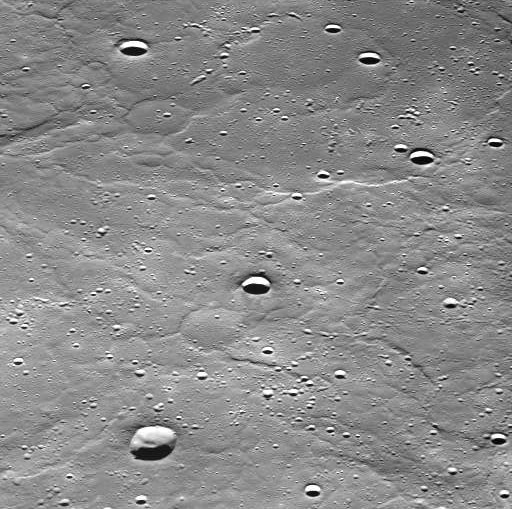
Typical Borealis Planitia, north of the crater Monteverdi

Borealis Planitia /bɒriːˈeɪɪs pləˈnɪʃiə/ is a large plain on Mercury with a smooth floor, thought to be similar to a lunar mare. It is centered at 73.4° N, 79.5° W. The name is Latin for Northern Plain.

Borealis Planitia was formed by volcanic activity around 3.7 billion years ago and is the largest region of smooth plains on the planet.
