= Machaut (crater) =

Crater on Mercury

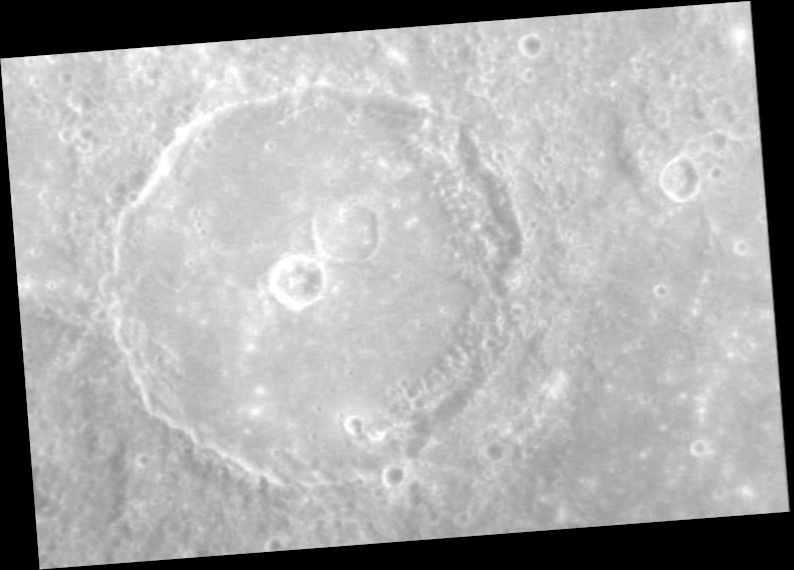
- MESSENGER NAC image of Machaut
- Feature type: Impact crater
- Location: Beethoven quadrangle, Mercury
- Coordinates: 2.05°S 82.37°W
- Diameter: 104 km (65 mi)
- Eponym: Guillaume de Machaut

Machaut is a crater on Mercury. Its name was adopted by the International Astronomical Union in 1976. Machaut is named for the French composer and poet Guillaume de Machaut, who lived from 1300 to 1377. The crater was first imaged by Mariner 10 in 1974.

Machaut is a volcanically modified crater. The floor was covered by volcanic deposits after the initial impact as shown by the partially submerged crater ("ghost crater") in the interior.

Machaut is north of Snorri crater and west of Caruso and Boethius.

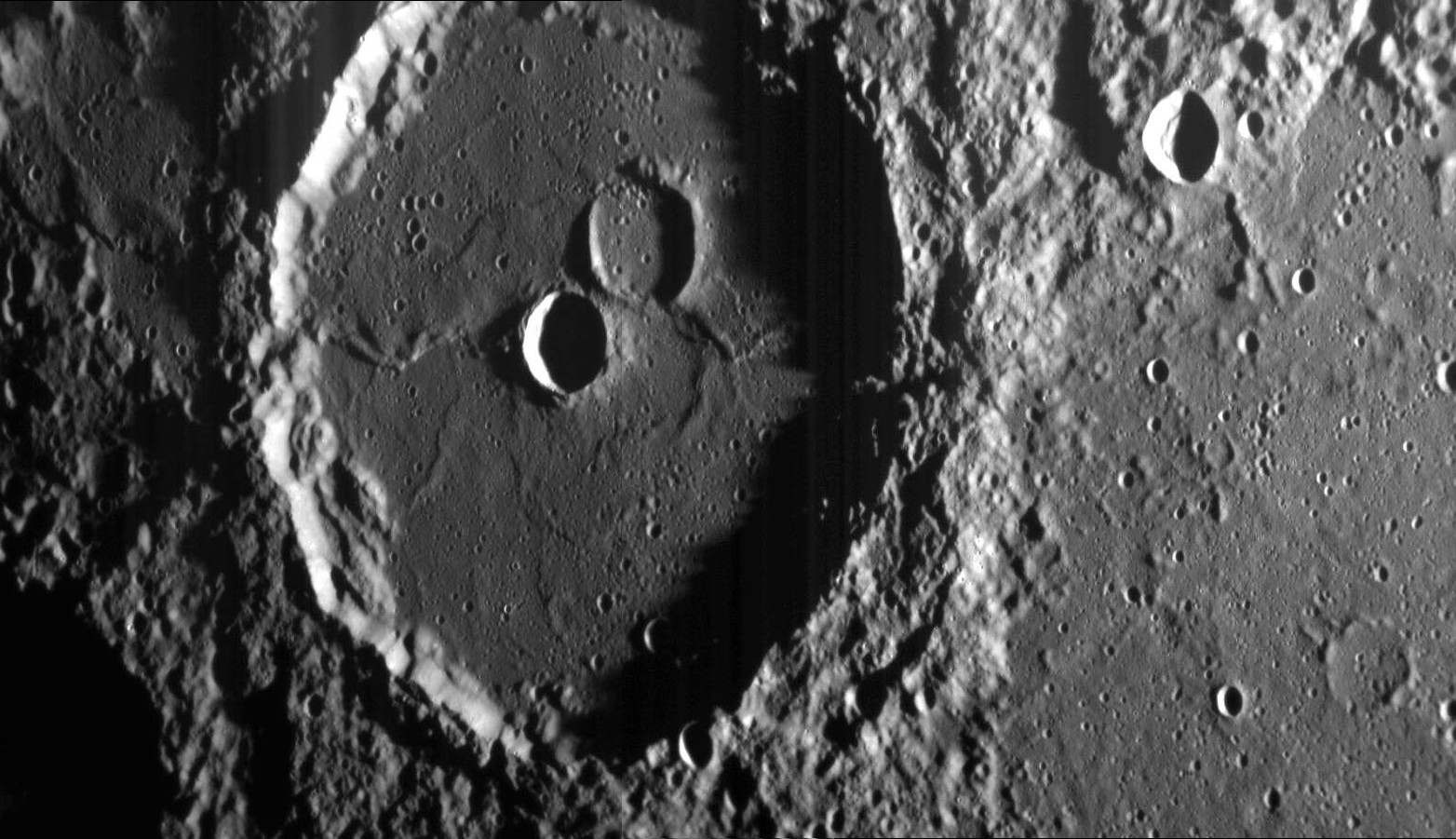
Machaut crater, from MESSENGER's second flyby in October 2008

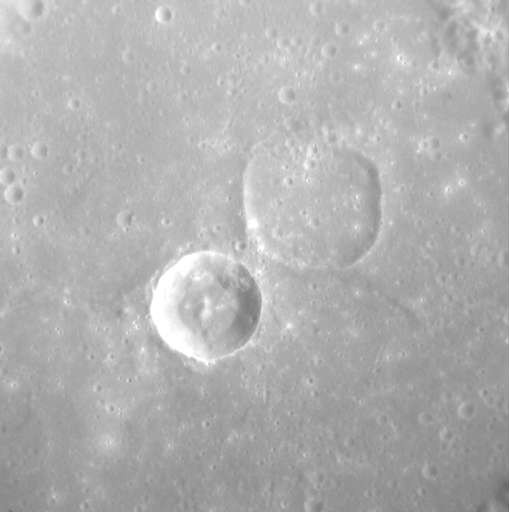
Crater interior, showing a fresh crater and a ghost crater
