= Stoddart (crater) =

Crater on Mercury

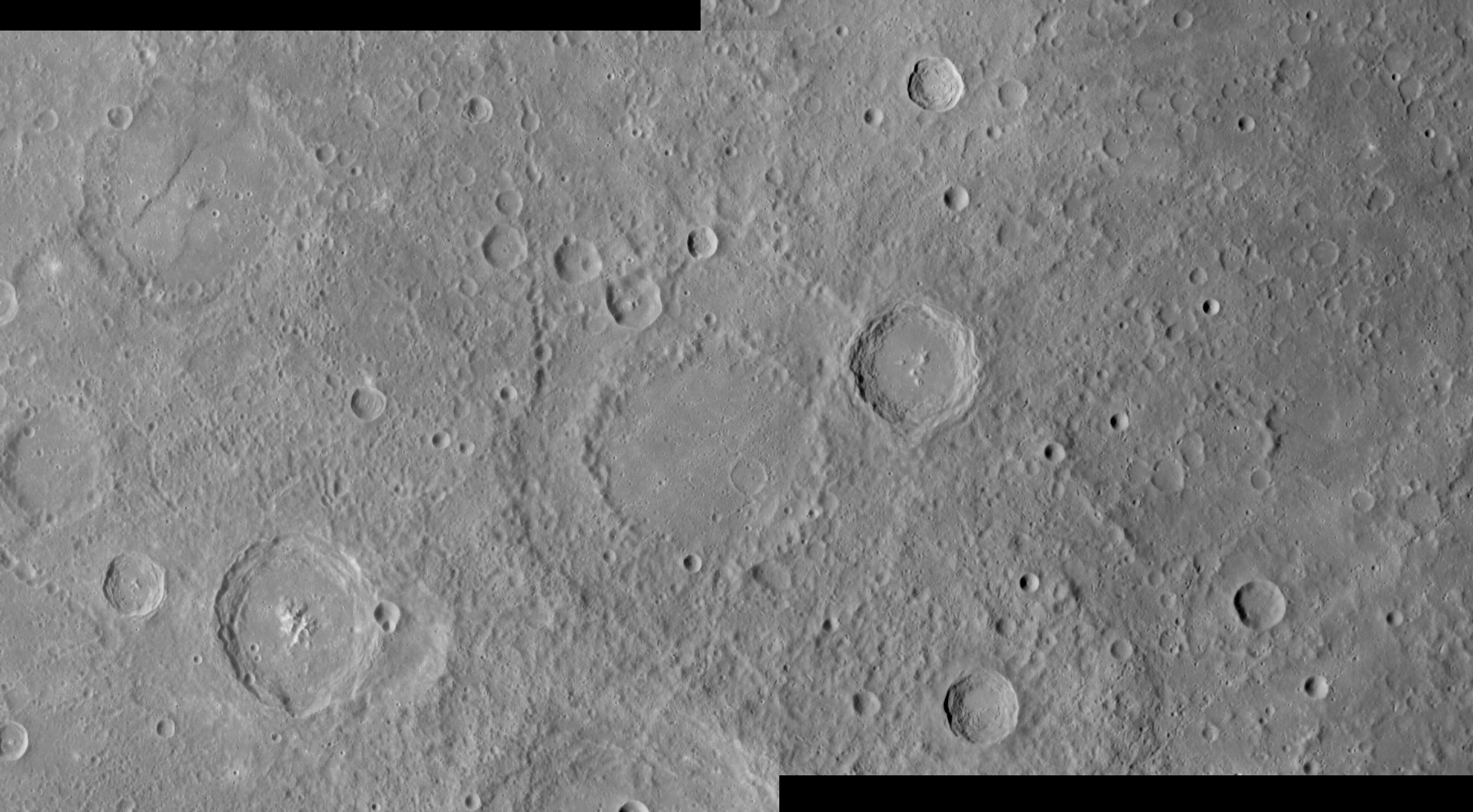
- MESSENGER mosaic
- Planet: Mercury
- Coordinates: 12.17°S 85.66°W
- Quadrangle: Beethoven
- Diameter: 155 km (96 mi)
- Eponym: Margaret Stoddart

Stoddart is a crater on Mercury. Its name was adopted by the International Astronomical Union (IAU) on August 26, 2024, for the New Zealand painter Margaret Stoddart, who lived from 1865 to 1934.

Stoddart is one of 110 peak ring basins on Mercury.

The crater Snorri is to the northeast of Stoddart. Sullivan and Futabatei are to the south.

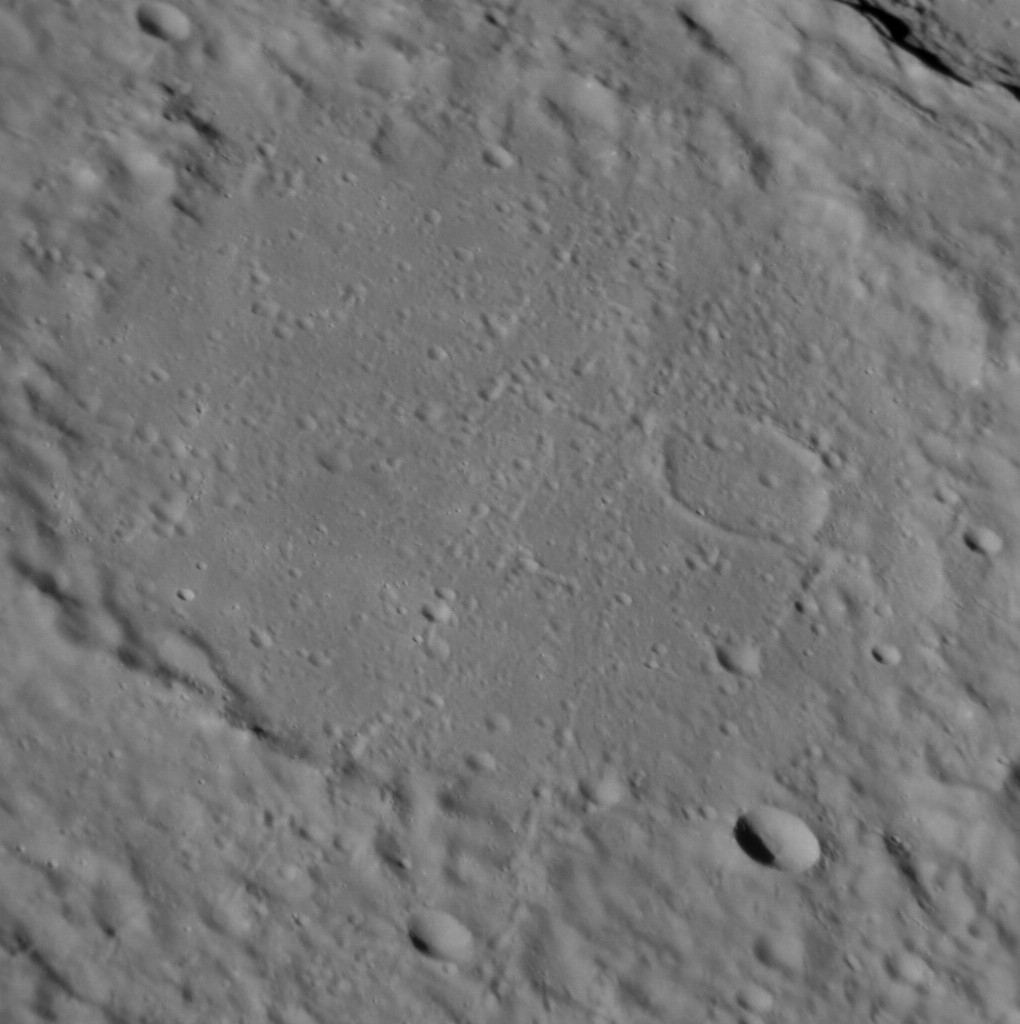
Central Stoddart crater (inner ring)

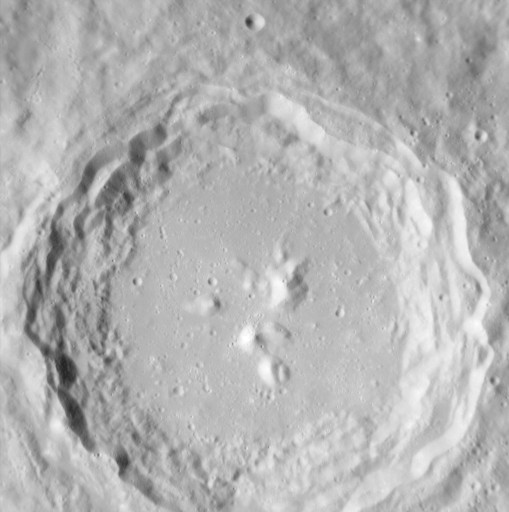
Unnamed crater on east rim
