= Thākur (crater) =

Crater on Mercury

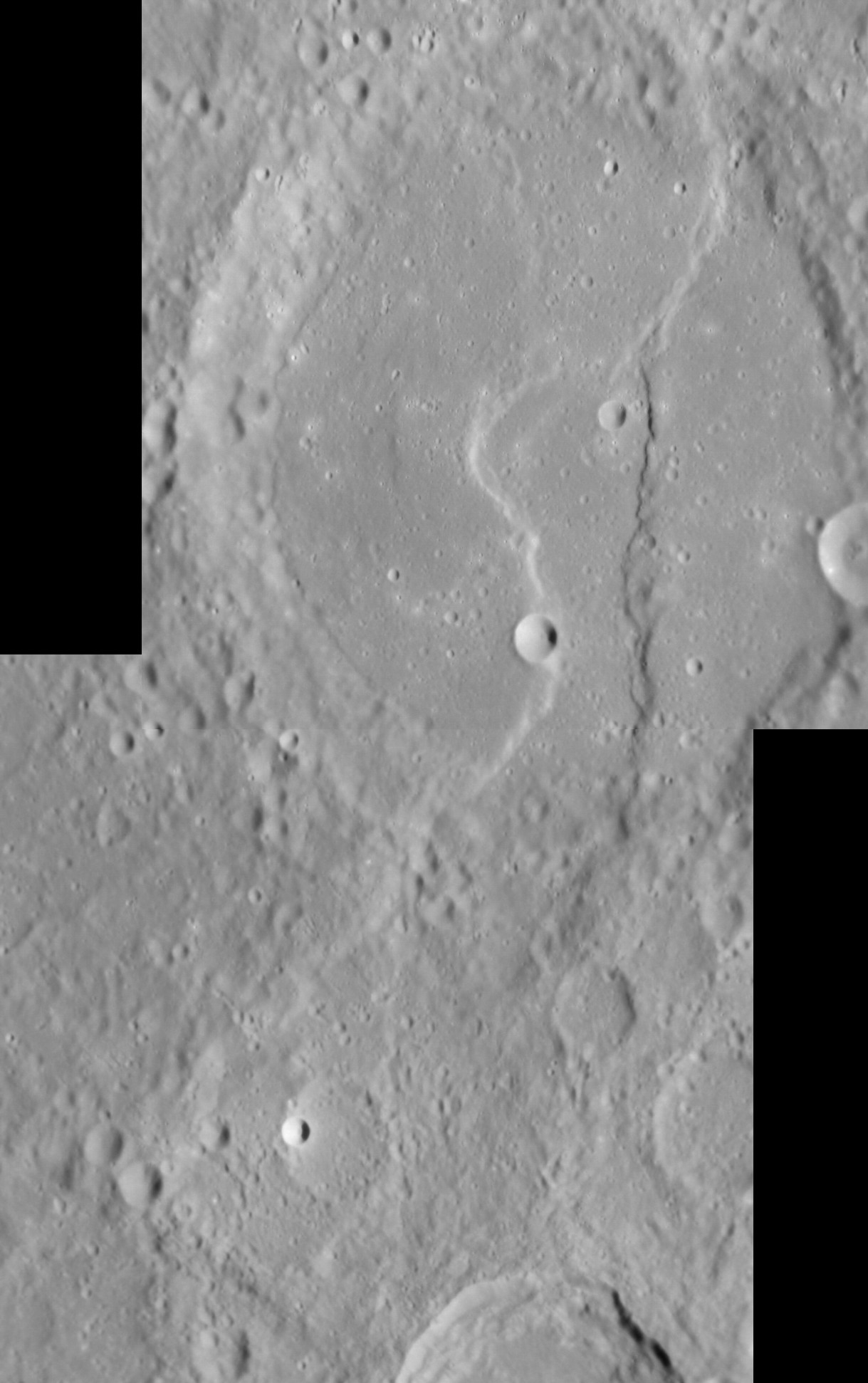
- MESSENGER NAC mosaic
- Planet: Mercury
- Coordinates: 3.05°S 64.57°W
- Quadrangle: Kuiper
- Diameter: 111 km (69 mi)
- Eponym: Rabindranath Tagore

Thākur is a crater on Mercury. It has a diameter of 111 kilometres (69 miles). Its name was adopted by the International Astronomical Union (IAU) in 1976. Thākur is named for the Indian writer Rabindranath Tagore. The crater was first imaged by Mariner 10 in 1974.

Scarps in the central and southern part of the crater enclose an area that is at a lower elevation than the rest of the crater. The scarps extend to the south out of the crater.

To the north of Thākur is the fresh crater Motonobu, and to the northwest is Polygnotus.

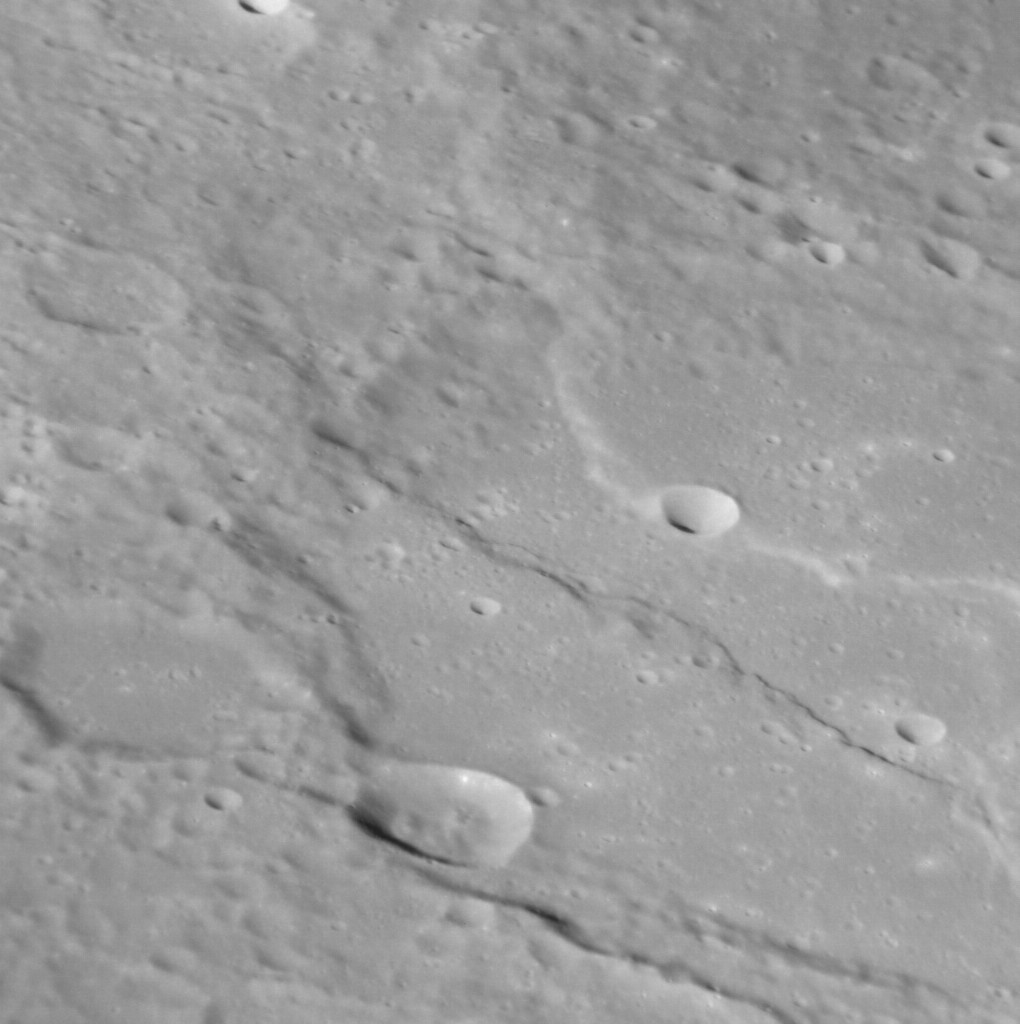
Oblique view of southern Thākur crater. Two prominent lobate scarps deform the crater. These scarps form when one block of crust thrusts up and over another, and are thought to have formed due to a reduction in Mercury's surface area as its interior cooled and contracted. The face of a scarp indicates the direction these blocks have moved so, as we see it here, Tharkur has been squeezed from the top-right and from the bottom-left.
