= Polygnotus (disambiguation) =

Polygnotus was an ancient Greek painter from the middle of the 5th century BC.

Polygnotus may also refer to:

- Polygnotos (vase painter) (fl. c. 450 BC – c. 420 BC), Greek vase painter in Athens
- Polygnotus (crater), a crater on Mercury
