= Snorri (crater) =

Crater on Mercury

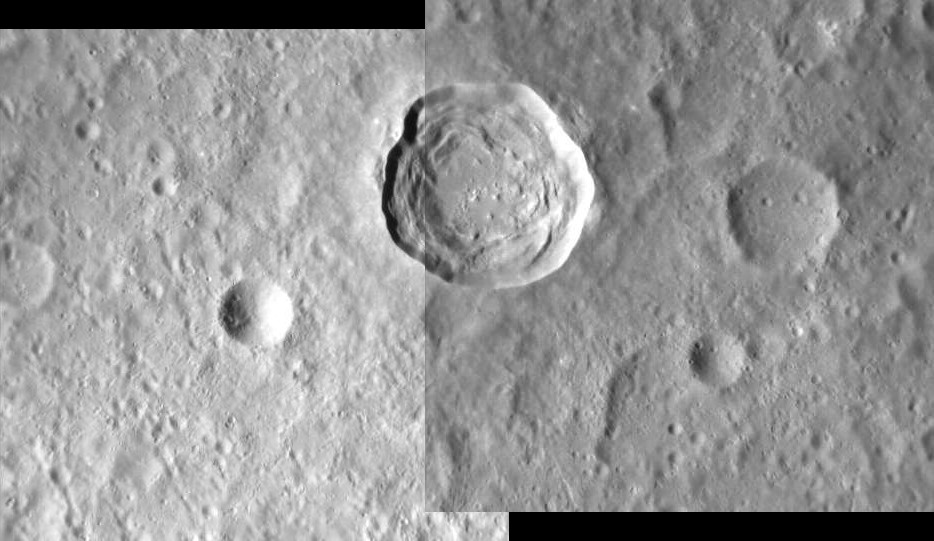
- MESSENGER NAC mosaic
- Planet: Mercury
- Coordinates: 9.17°S 83.24°W
- Quadrangle: Beethoven
- Diameter: 21 km (13 mi)
- Eponym: Snorri Sturluson

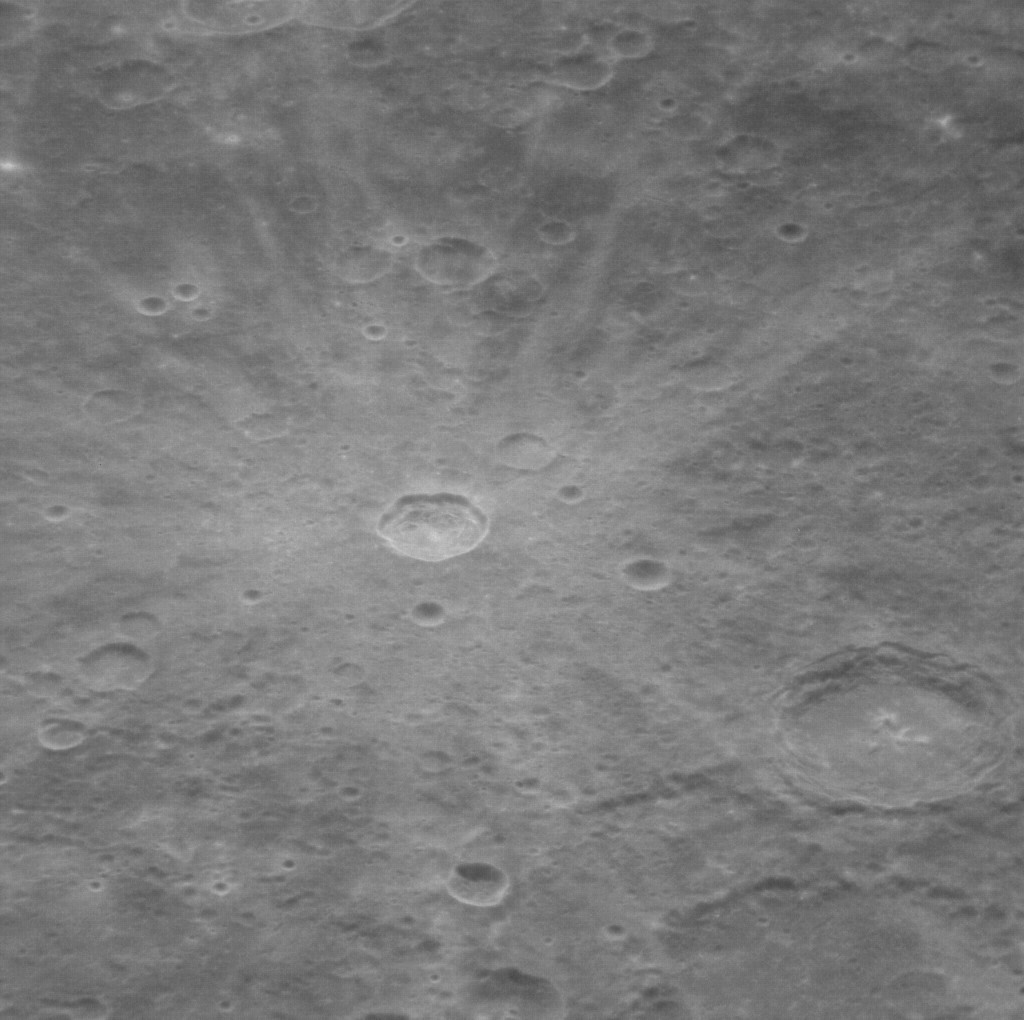
The ray system of Snorri crater

Snorri is a crater on Mercury. Its name was adopted by the International Astronomical Union (IAU) in 1976. Snorri is named for the Icelandic poet Snorri Sturluson. The crater was first imaged by Mariner 10 in 1974.

Snorri has a prominent ray system, indicating young age.

Snorri is south of Machaut crater and northeast of the peak ring crater Stoddart.
