= Tansen (crater) =

Crater on Mercury

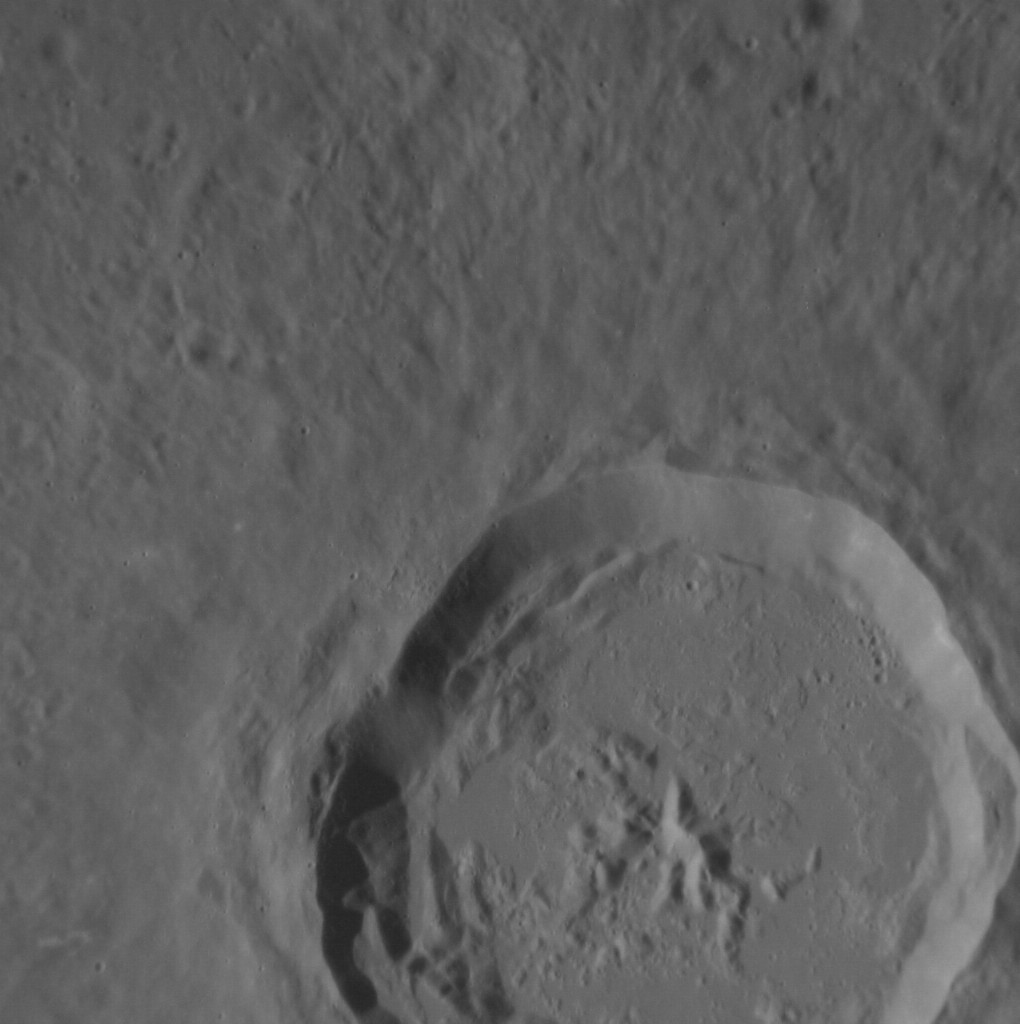
- MESSENGER NAC
- Planet: Mercury
- Coordinates: 4.11°N 71.67°W
- Quadrangle: Kuiper
- Diameter: 27.0 km (16.8 mi)
- Eponym: Tansen

Tansen is a crater on Mercury. Its name was adopted by the International Astronomical Union (IAU) in 1976. The crater is named for Tansen, Mughal composer from the court of Akbar. The crater was first imaged by Mariner 10 in 1974.

Tansen has a bright ray system indicating it is a recent impact.

To the southeast of Tansen is the crater Polygnotus, and to the southwest is Boethius.

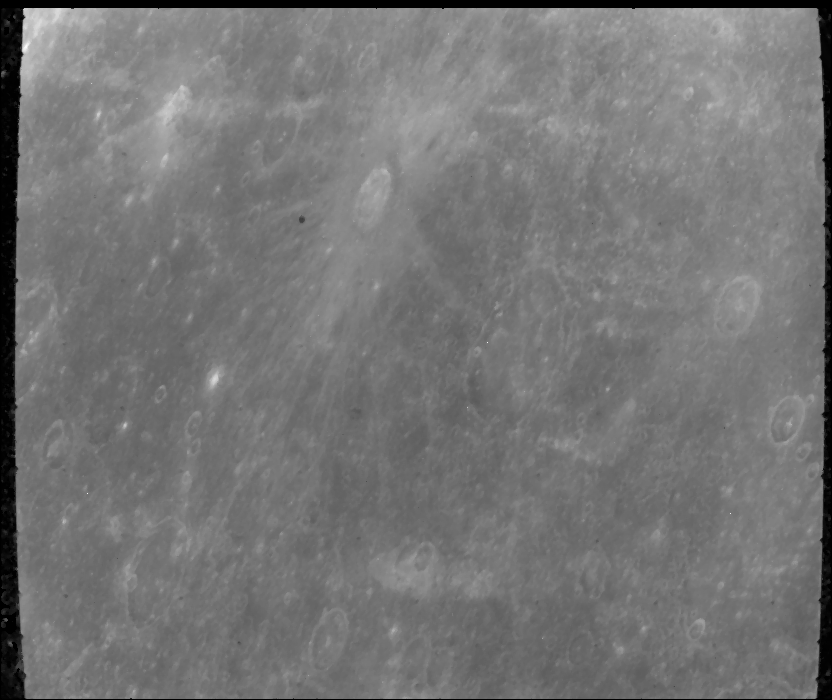
Mariner 10 image with Tansen above center

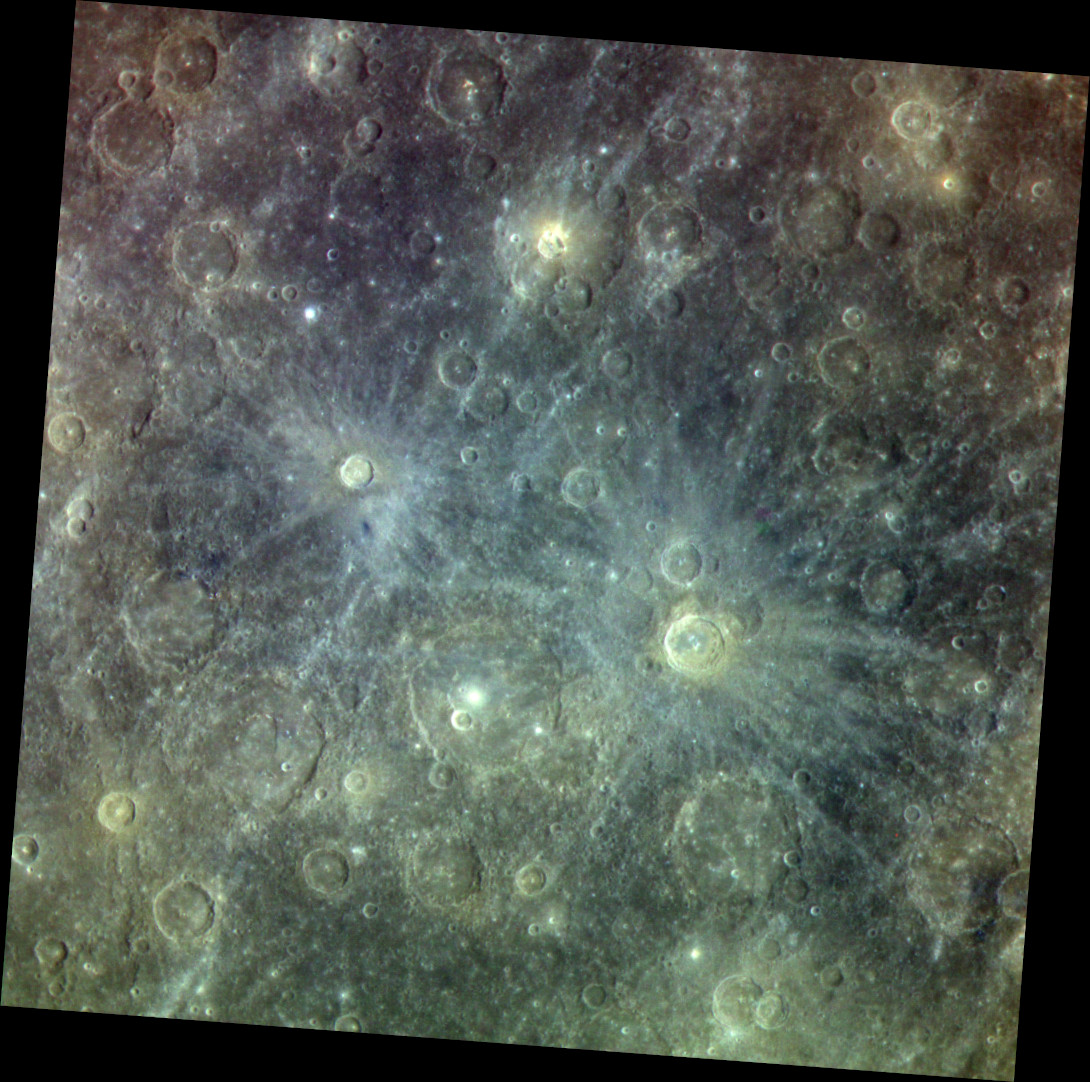
Exaggerated color image with Tansen left of center and Motonobu at right, both with bright ray systems

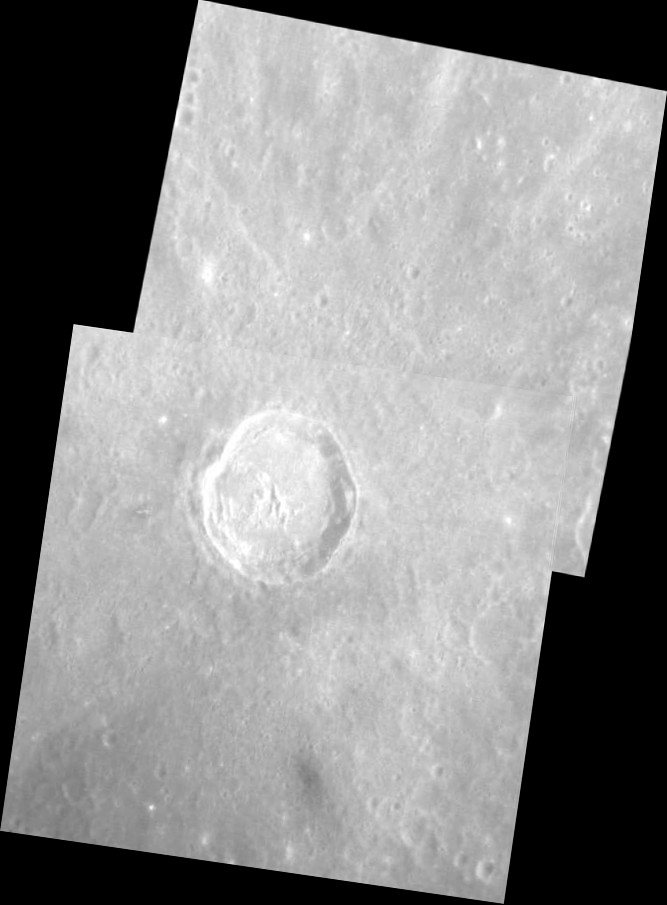
Tansen and vicinity
