= Sullivan (Mercurian crater) =

Crater on Mercury

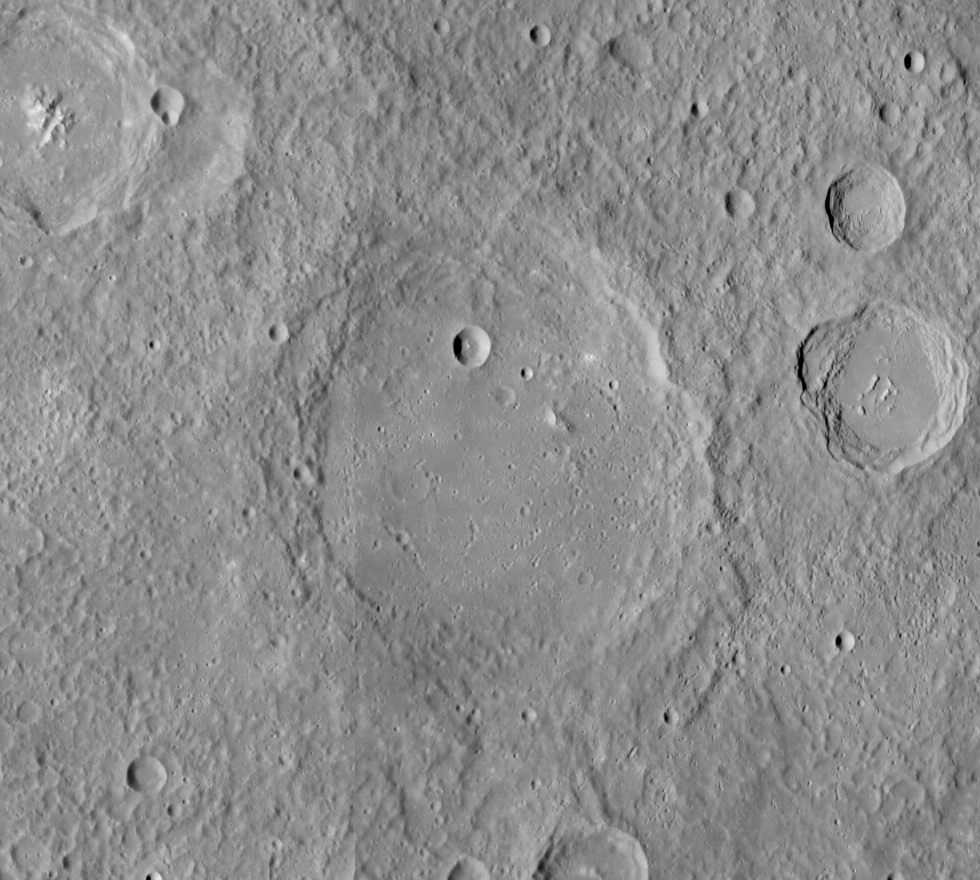
- MESSENGER mosaic
- Feature type: Impact crater
- Location: Beethoven quadrangle, Mercury
- Coordinates: 16.19°S 86.88°W
- Diameter: 153.23 km (95.21 mi)
- Eponym: Louis Sullivan

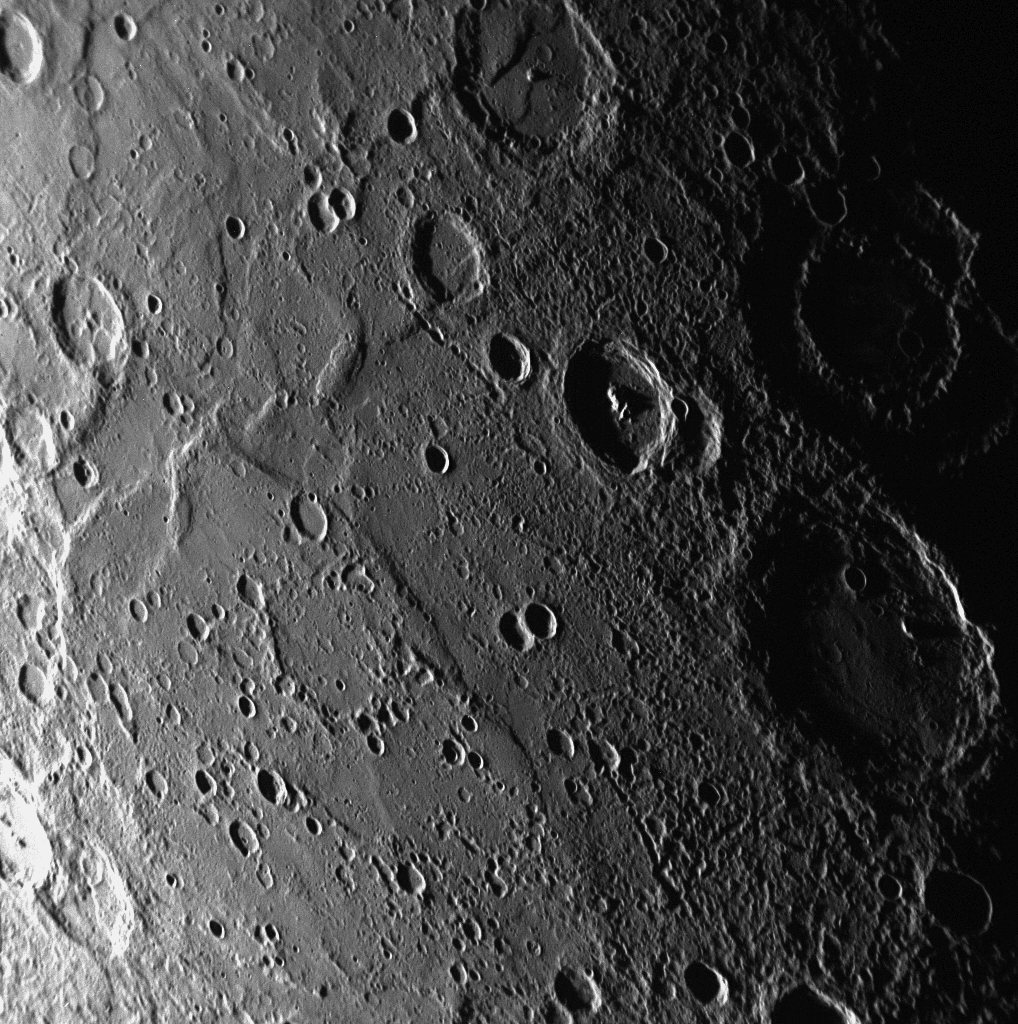
Oblique view with Sullivan along right edge, from MESSENGER's first flyby in 2008

Sullivan is a crater on Mercury. Its name was adopted by the International Astronomical Union (IAU) in 1976, and is named for the American architect Louis Sullivan. The crater was first imaged by Mariner 10 in 1974.

Sullivan is west of the smaller but younger Futabatei crater. To the north of Sullivan is Stoddart.
