= Motonobu (crater) =

Crater on Mercury

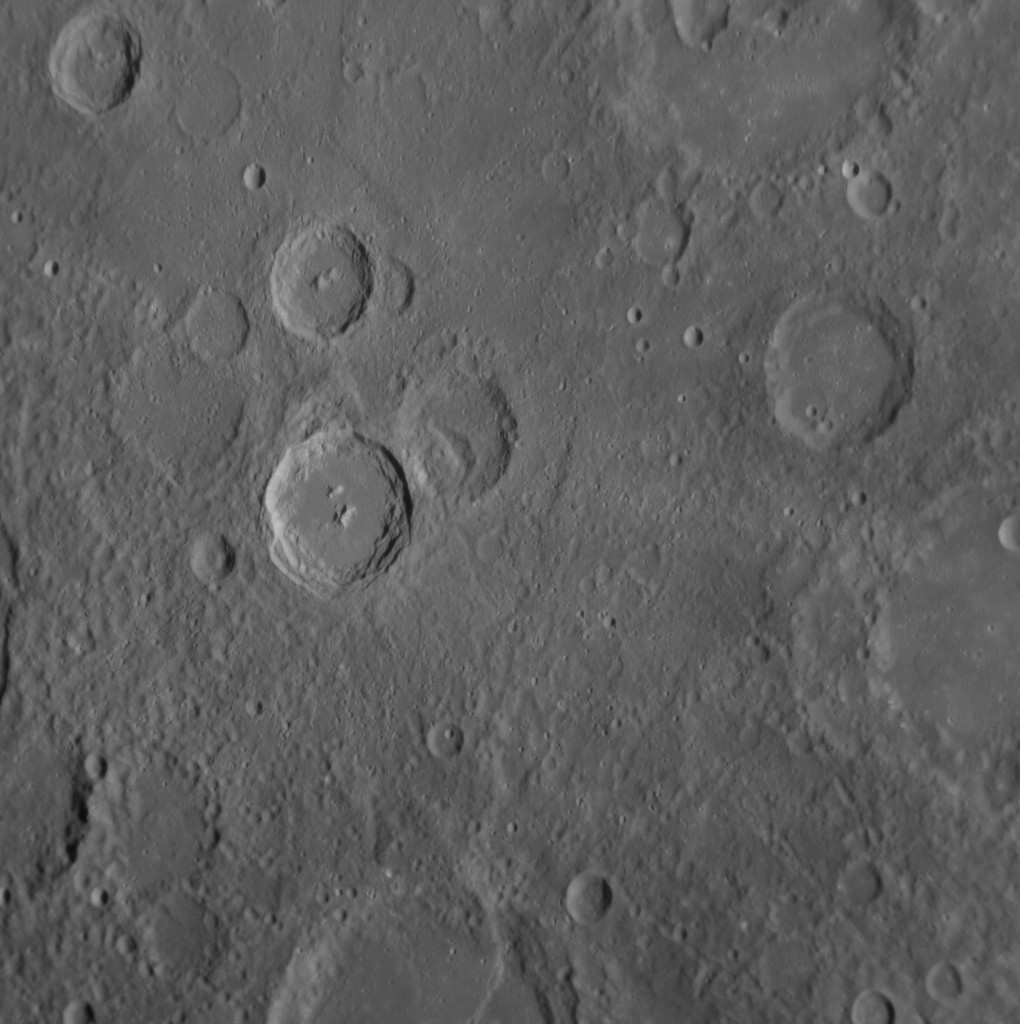
- MESSENGER NAC from second flyby in October 2008
- Planet: Mercury
- Coordinates: 0.78°N 65.32°W
- Quadrangle: Kuiper
- Diameter: 52 km (32 mi)
- Eponym: Kanō Motonobu

Motonobu is a crater on Mercury. Its name was adopted by the International Astronomical Union (IAU) on August 13, 2024, for the Japanese painter and calligrapher, Kanō Motonobu, who lived from 1476 to 1559. The crater was first imaged by Mariner 10 in 1974.

The crater has a ray system, indicating it is a recent impact.

Motonobu is to the east of the crater Polygnotus and north of the crater Thākur.

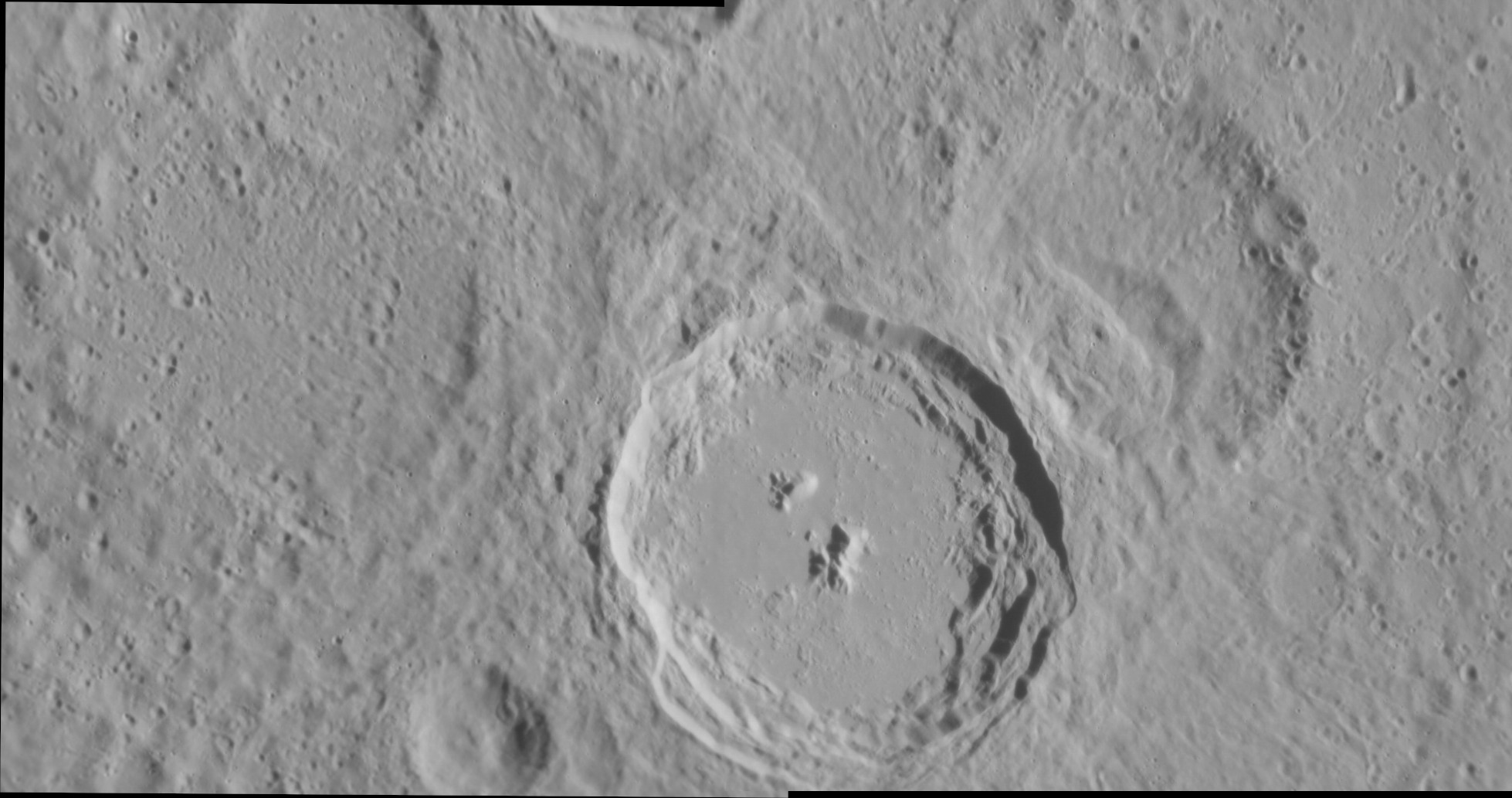
Mosaic showing detail

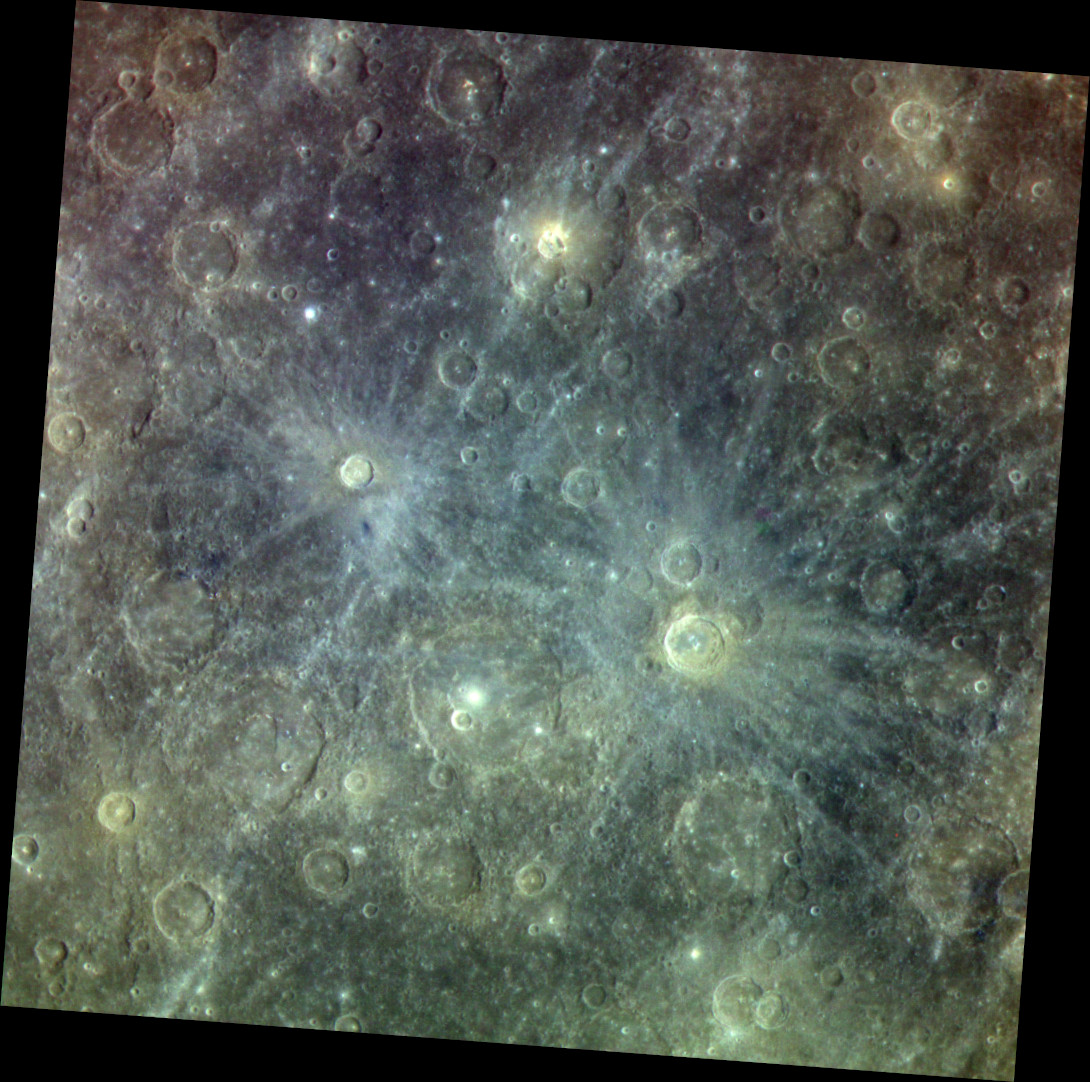
Exaggerated color image with Motonobu at right and Tansen left of center, both with bright ray systems
