= Futabatei (crater) =

Crater on Mercury

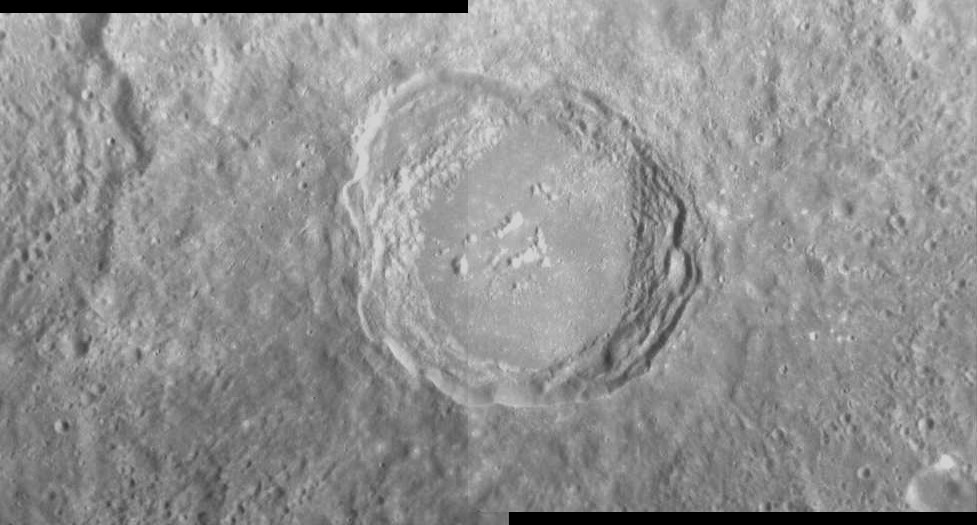
- MESSENGER mosaic of Futabei and surrounding regions
- Feature type: Central-peak impact crater
- Location: Beethoven quadrangle, Mercury
- Coordinates: 16.05°S 83.52°W
- Diameter: 57 km (35 mi)
- Eponym: Futabatei Shimei

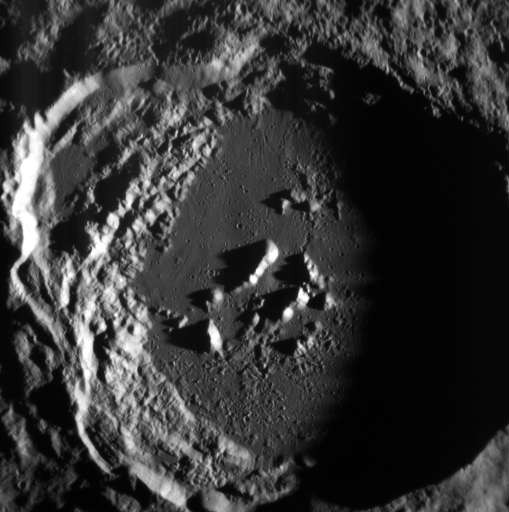
Futabatei crater at a low sun angle

Futabatei is a crater on Mercury. It has a diameter of 57 kilometers. Its name was adopted by the International Astronomical Union in 1976. Futabatei is named for the Japanese novelist Futabatei Shimei, who lived from 1864 to 1909. The crater was first imaged by Mariner 10 in 1974.

Futabatei is one of the largest craters of the Kuiperian system on Mercury. The largest is Bartók crater.

Futabatei is east of the larger Sullivan crater, and northwest of the large basin Raphael.
