= Boethius (Mercurian crater) =

Crater on Mercury

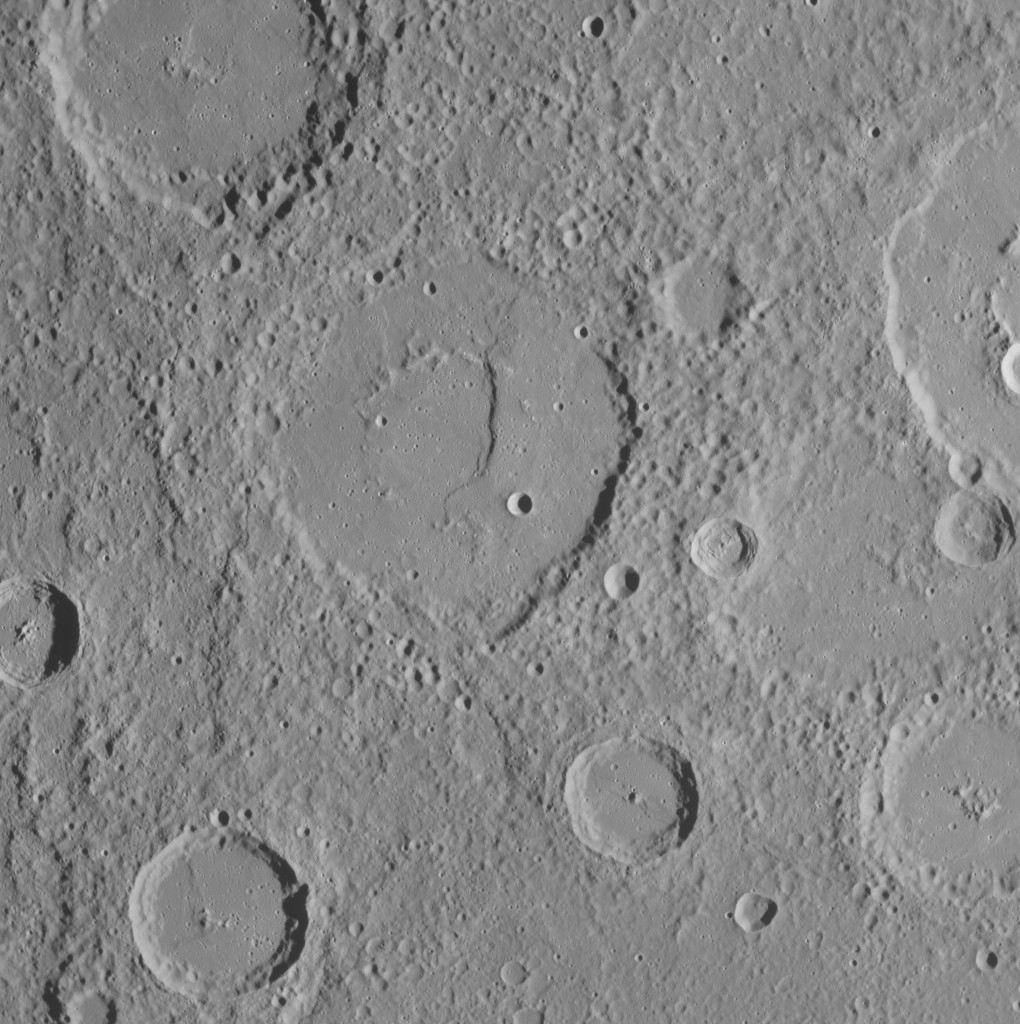
- MESSENGER WAC of Boethius
- Feature type: Impact crater
- Location: Beethoven quadrangle, Mercury
- Coordinates: 0.98°S 73.64°W
- Diameter: 114 km (71 mi)
- Eponym: Boethius

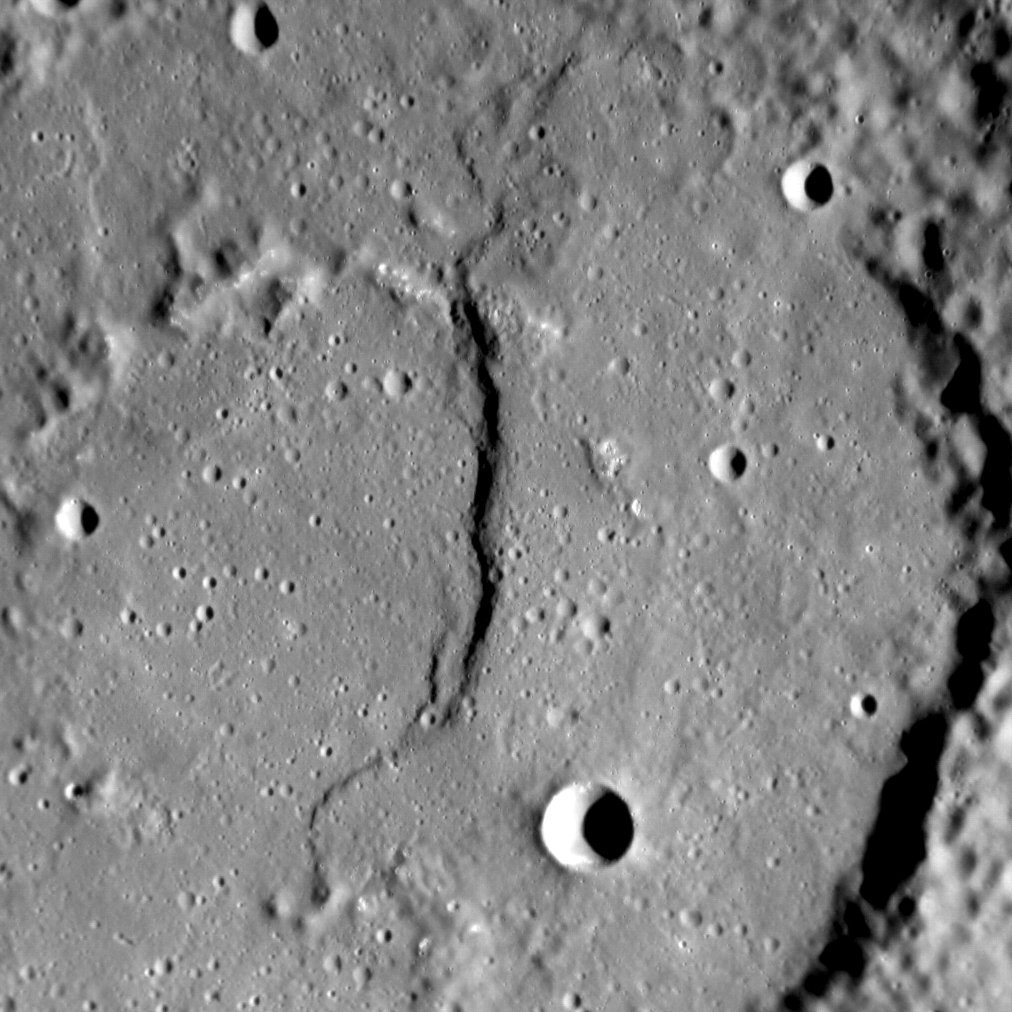
Hollows on the peaks in central Boethius crater, with the prominent scarp at center.

Boethius is a crater on the planet Mercury. It was named after Anicius Manlius Severinus Boethius, the Roman philosopher, by the IAU in 1976. The crater was first imaged by Mariner 10 in 1974.

Boethius is filled with smooth plains material, covering its original surface, and it has been subsequently deformed by a scarp. Boethius is one of 110 peak ring basins on Mercury, but only the northern arc of the peak ring is visible. Hollows are present on the arc of mountains.

The smaller crater Caruso is west of Boethius, and Polygnotus is to the east. Tansen is to the northeast.
