= Caruso (crater) =

Crater on Mercury

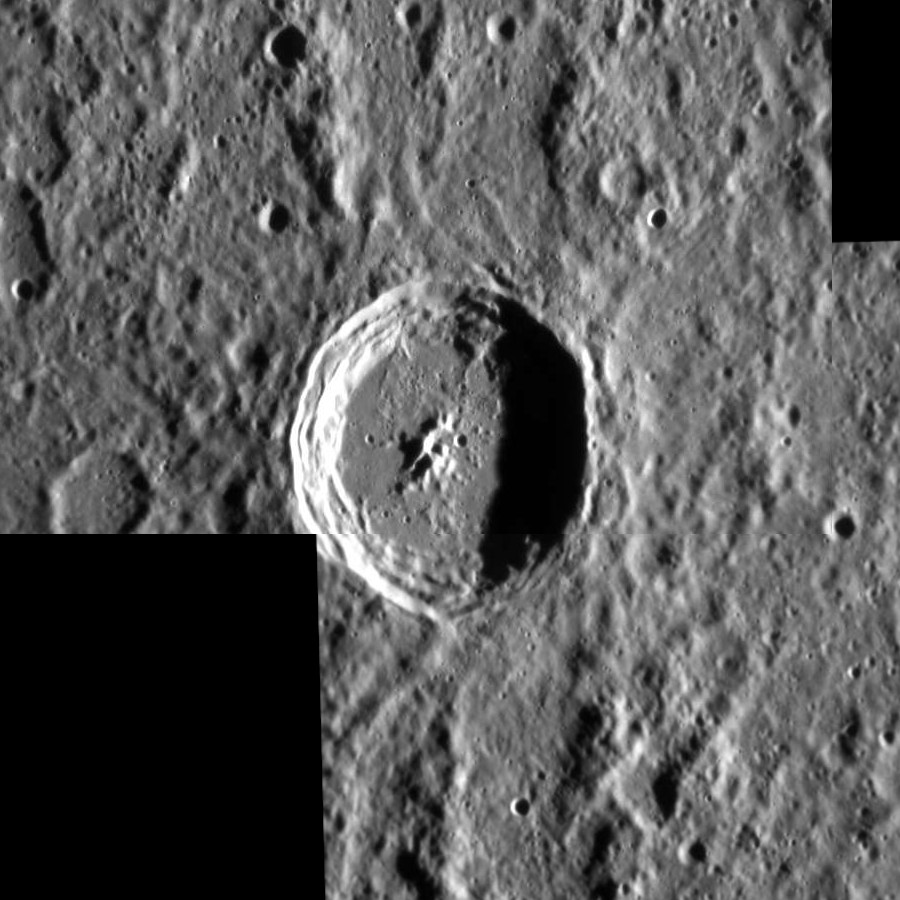
- MESSENGER NAC mosaic of Caruso
- Feature type: Central-peak impact crater
- Location: Beethoven quadrangle, Mercury
- Coordinates: 2.33°S 76.36°W
- Diameter: 31 km (19 mi)
- Eponym: Enrico Caruso

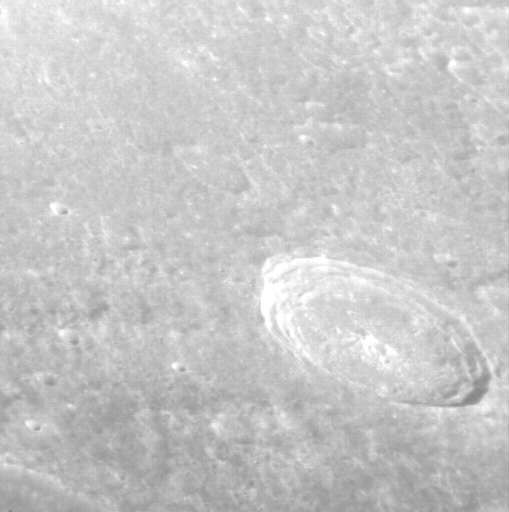
Oblique view

Caruso is a crater on Mercury. Its name was adopted by the International Astronomical Union (IAU) on December 16, 2013. Caruso is named for the Italian singer Enrico Caruso. The crater was first imaged by Mariner 10 in 1974, but was not named at that time.

The larger crater Boethius is east of Caruso.
