= Polygnotus (crater) =

Crater on Mercury

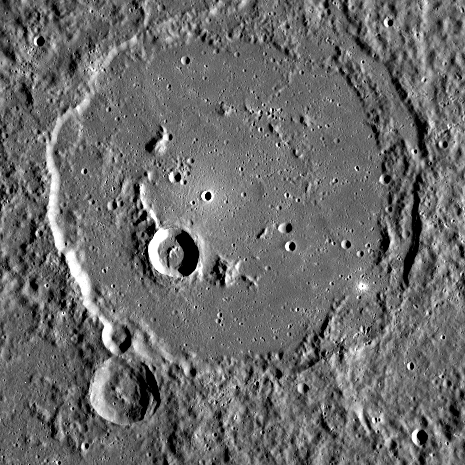
- An image of Polygnotus. Its central peak ring has been partially submerged by smooth plains material
- Feature type: Peak-ring impact basin
- Location: Kuiper quadrangle, Mercury
- Coordinates: 0.13°S 69.26°W
- Diameter: 124 km (77 mi)
- Eponym: Polygnotus

Polygnotus is a crater on Mercury, named by the IAU in 1976, after ancient Greek painter Polygnotus. The crater was first imaged by Mariner 10 in 1974.

Polygnotus has a central peak ring which is embayed with smooth plains material, which is very different in texture from the surrounding terrain. It is one of 110 peak ring basins on Mercury.

Boethius crater is west of Polygnotus. Tansen is to the northwest, and Motonobu is to the east.

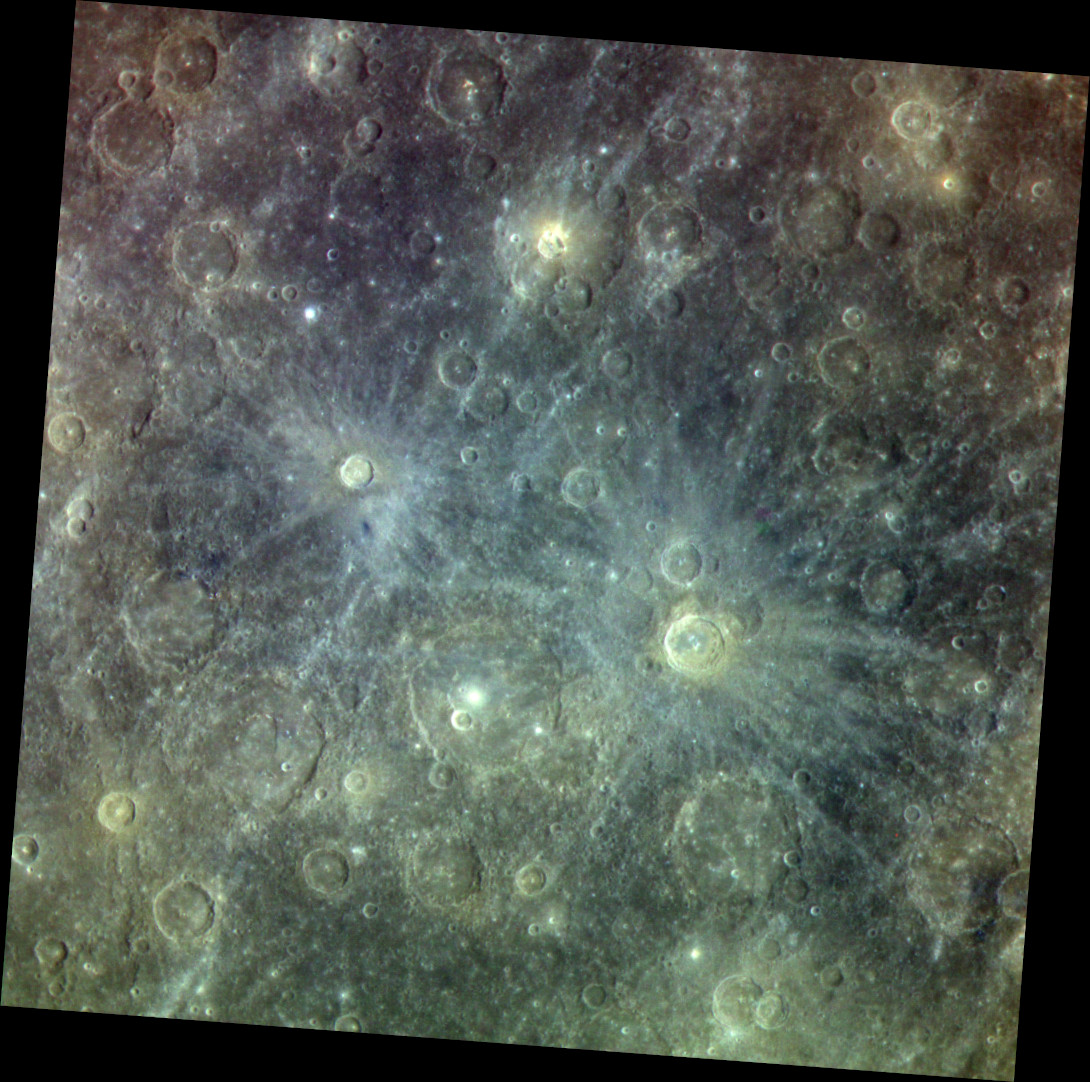
Exaggerated color image with Polygnotus near center

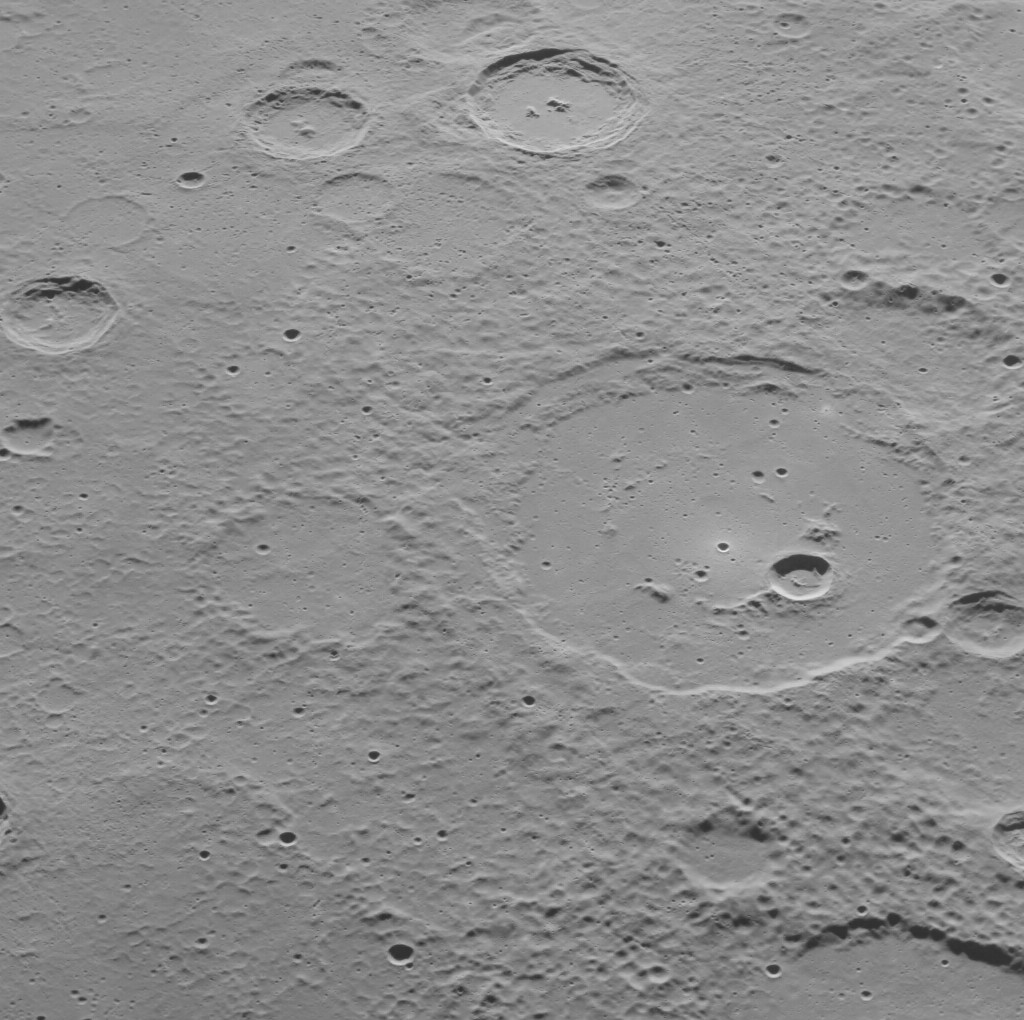
Distant oblique view showing Polygnotus at right and Motonobu at top center
