= Monk (crater) =

Crater on Mercury

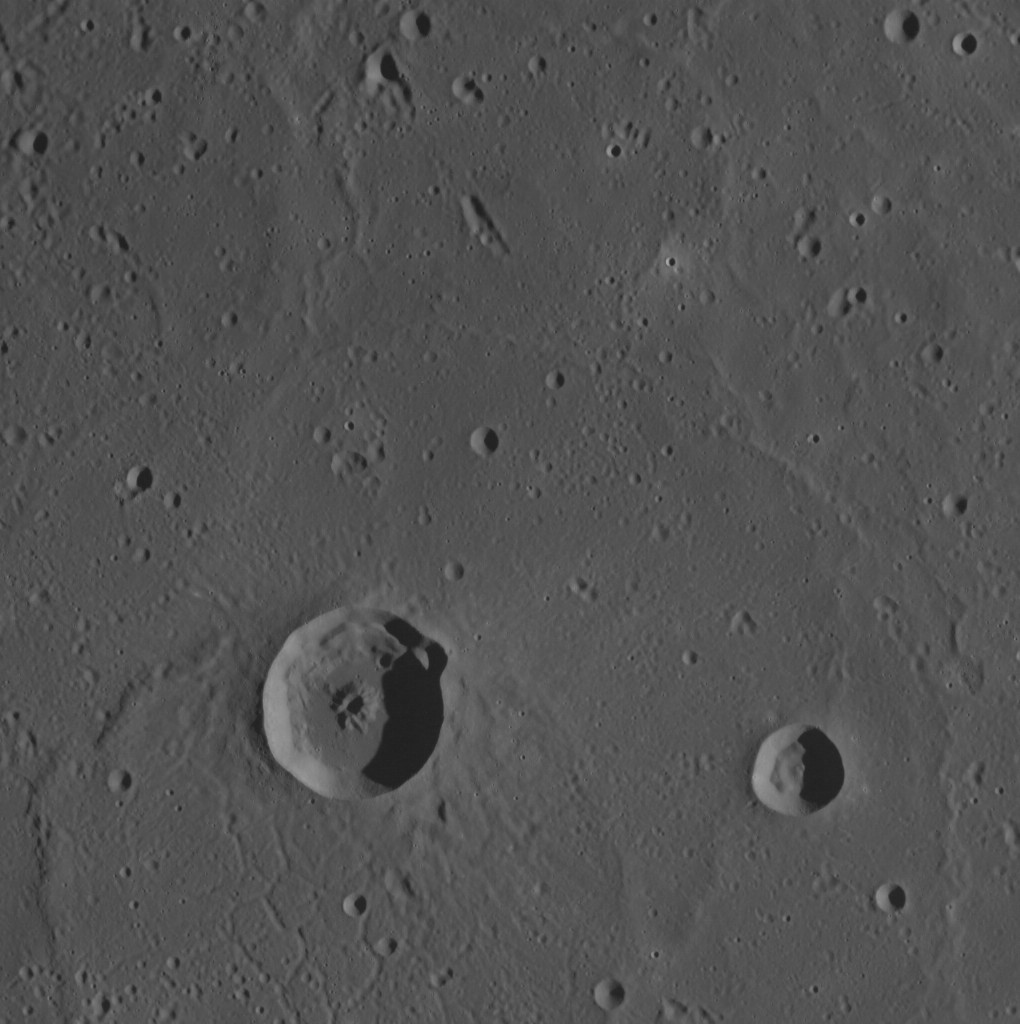
- MESSENGER image of Egonu (left) and Monk (right) craters
- Planet: Mercury
- Coordinates: 66.08°N 296.19°W
- Quadrangle: Borealis
- Diameter: 12 km
- Eponym: Thelonious Monk

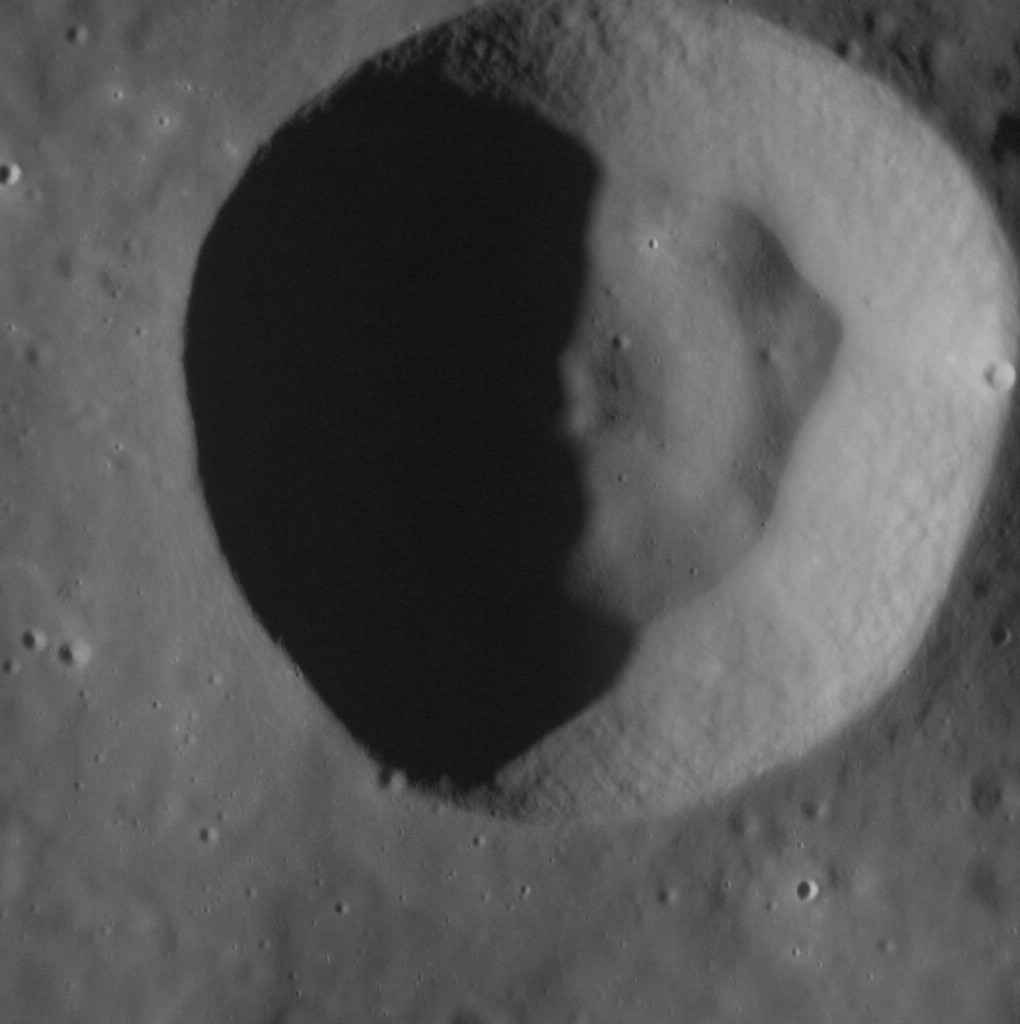
MESSENGER NAC image of Monk

Monk is a crater on Mercury. Its name was adopted by the International Astronomical Union in 2013, after American jazz musician and composer Thelonious Monk.
