= Egonu (crater) =

Crater on Mercury

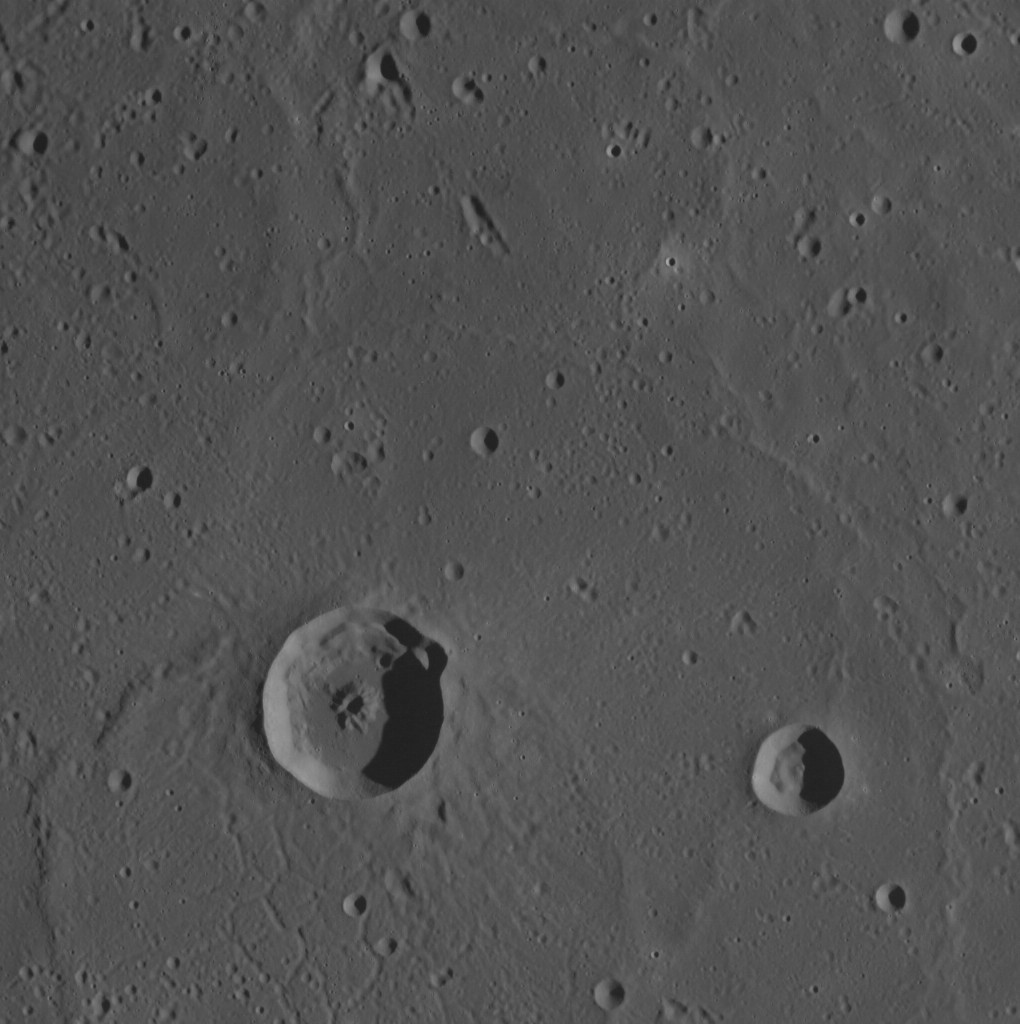
- MESSENGER image of Egonu (left) and Monk (right) craters
- Planet: Mercury
- Coordinates: 67.15°N 298.52°W
- Quadrangle: Borealis
- Diameter: 25 km
- Eponym: Uzo Egonu

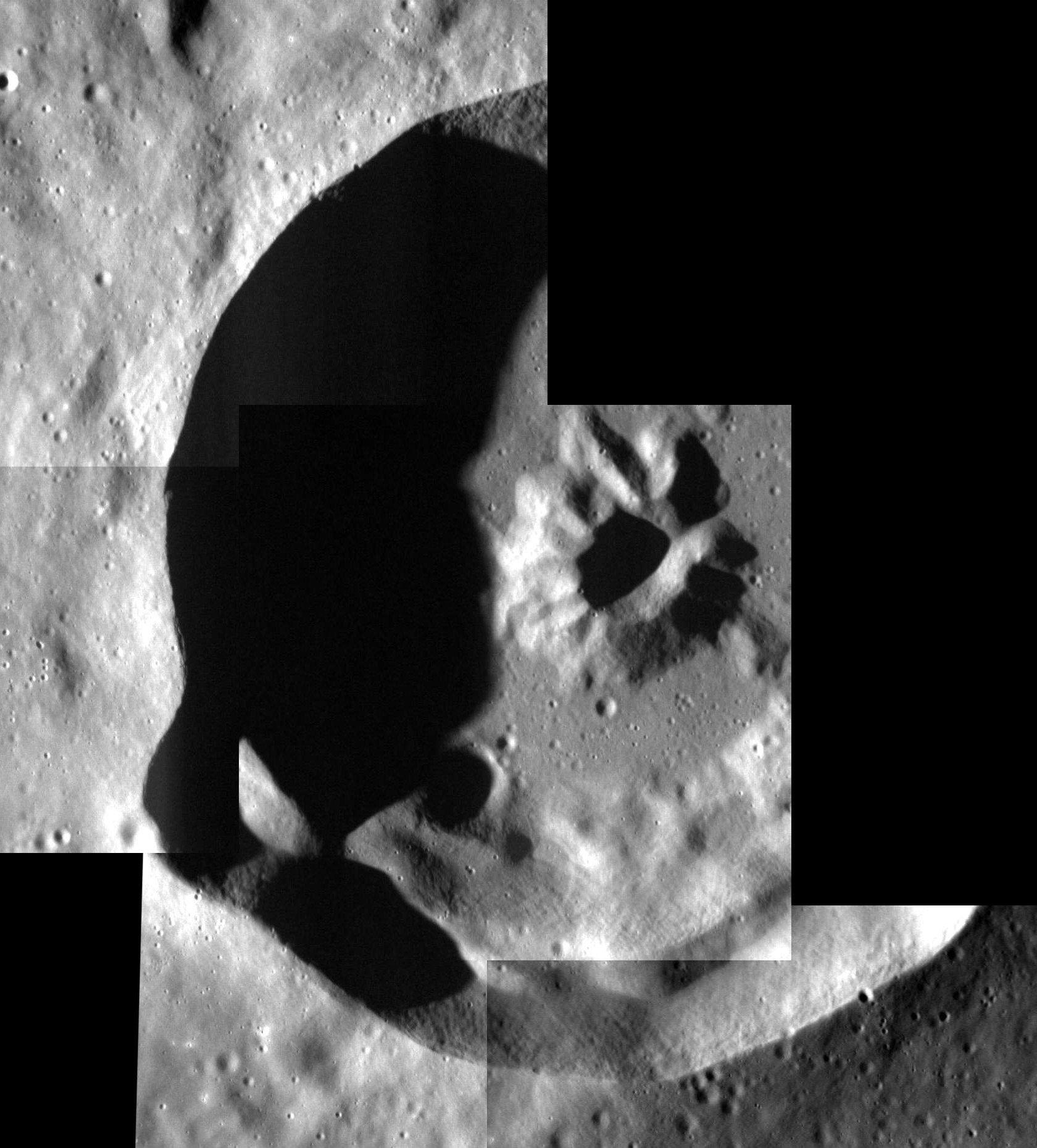
Mosaic of Egonu crater from MESSENGER NAC images

Egonu is a crater on Mercury. Its name was adopted by the International Astronomical Union in 2012, after Nigerian artist Uzo Egonu.
