= Ma Chih-Yuan (crater) =

Crater on Mercury

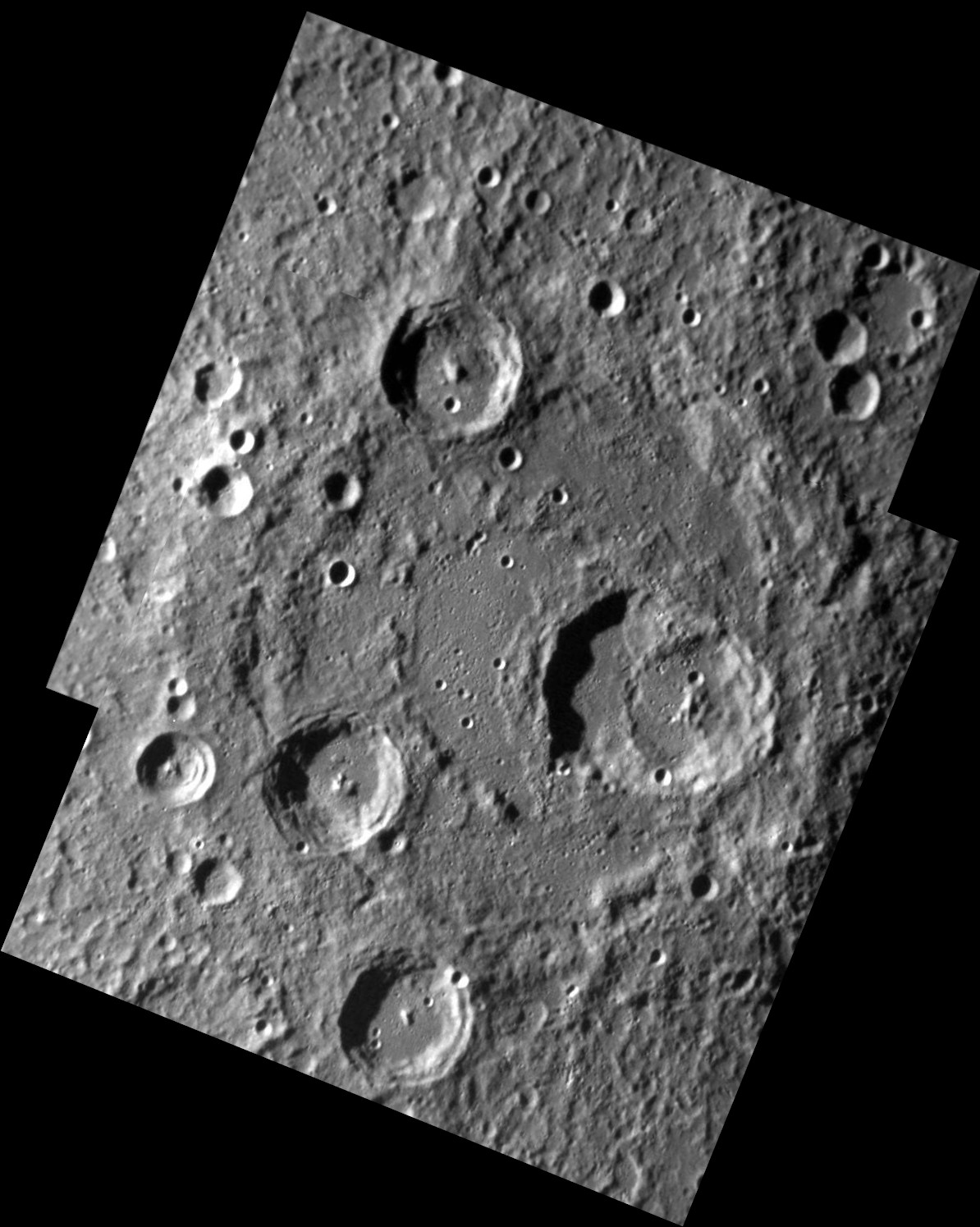
- MESSENGER NAC mosaic of Ma Chih-Yuan
- Feature type: Peak-ring impact basin
- Location: Discovery quadrangle, Mercury
- Coordinates: 60.01°S 78.01°W
- Diameter: 197.0 km (122.4 mi)
- Eponym: Ma Zhiyuan

Ma Chih-Yuan is a crater on Mercury. Its name was adopted by the International Astronomical Union (IAU) in 1976. Ma Chih-Yuan is named for the Chinese playwright Ma Zhiyuan, who lived in the 13th century CE.

Ma Chih-Yuan is one of 110 peak ring basins on Mercury. It is ancient and highly eroded, unlike Raditladi, for example.

To the east of Ma Chih-Yuan is Rabelais crater. To the northeast is Coleridge crater, and to the southwest is Sei crater.
