= Schubert (Mercurian crater) =

Crater on Mercury

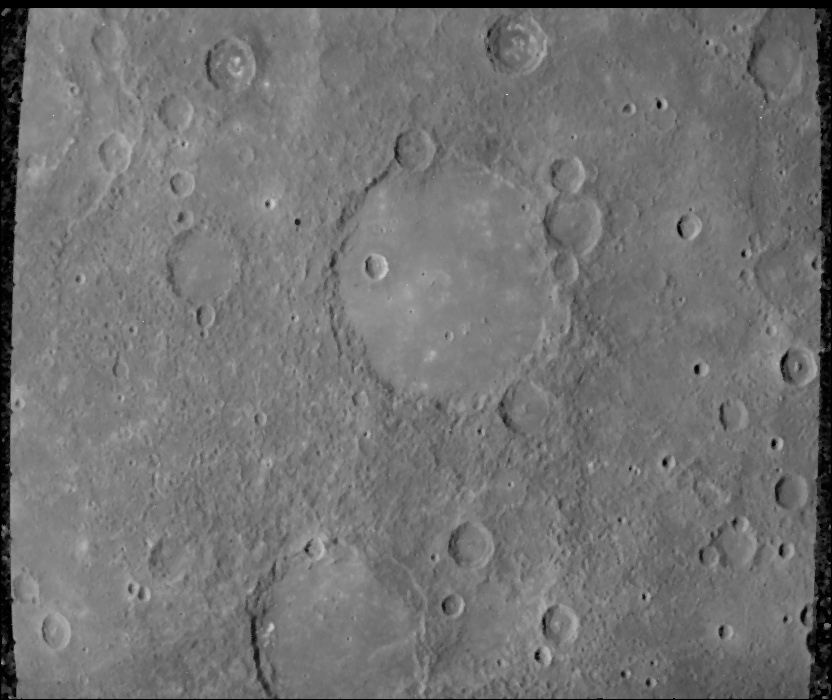
- Mariner 10 image with Schubert at center
- Feature type: Impact crater
- Location: Discovery quadrangle, Mercury
- Coordinates: 43.21°S 54.26°W
- Diameter: 190 km
- Eponym: Franz Schubert

Schubert is a crater on Mercury. It was named after Franz Schubert, a famous Austrian composer, by the IAU in 1976.

Schubert has been filled in by smooth plains material.

Nearby craters include Wergeland to the north, Nampeyo to the northeast, and Bramante to the southwest.

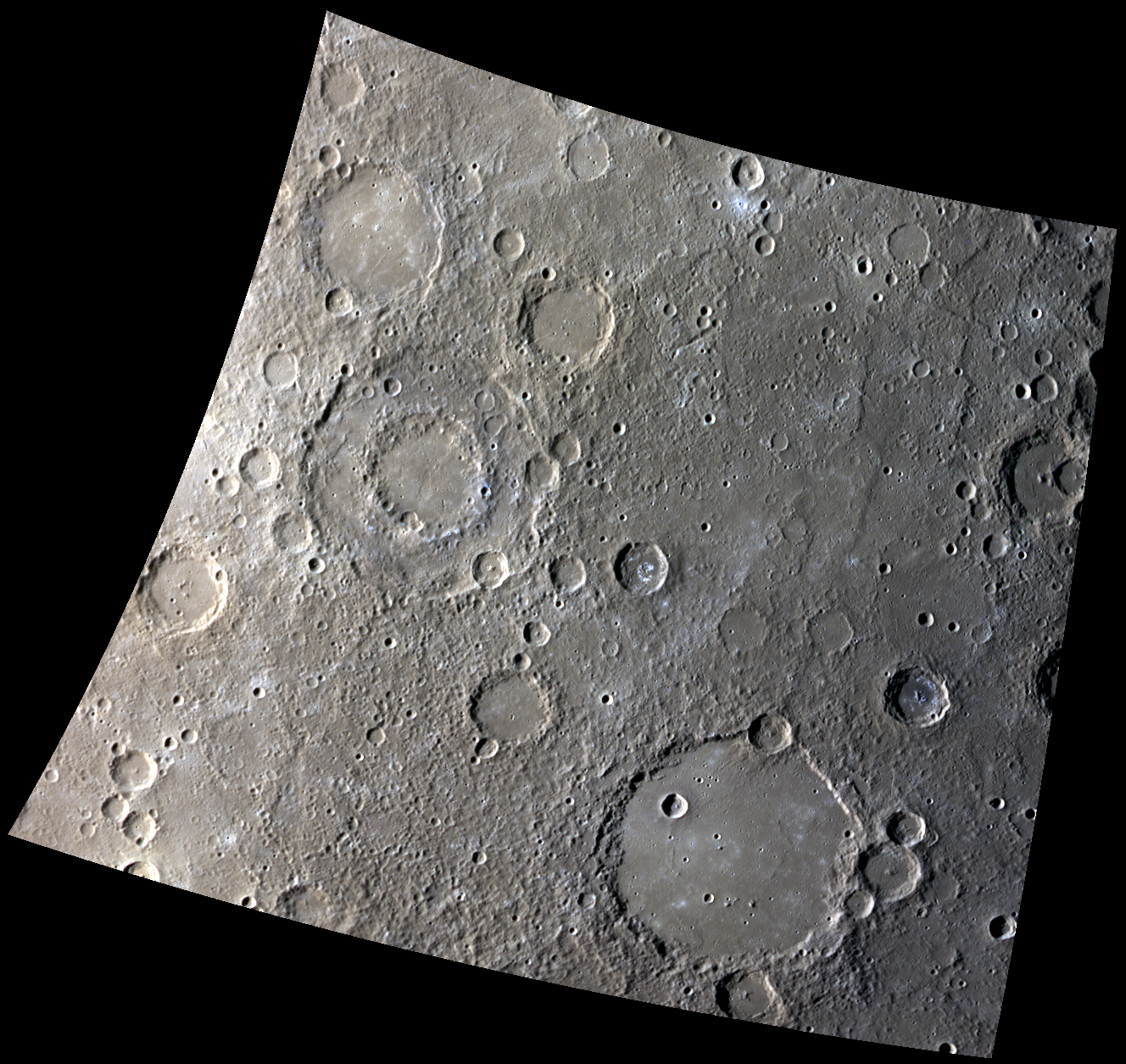
MESSENGER mosaic with Schubert at lower right and Chekhov at upper left.

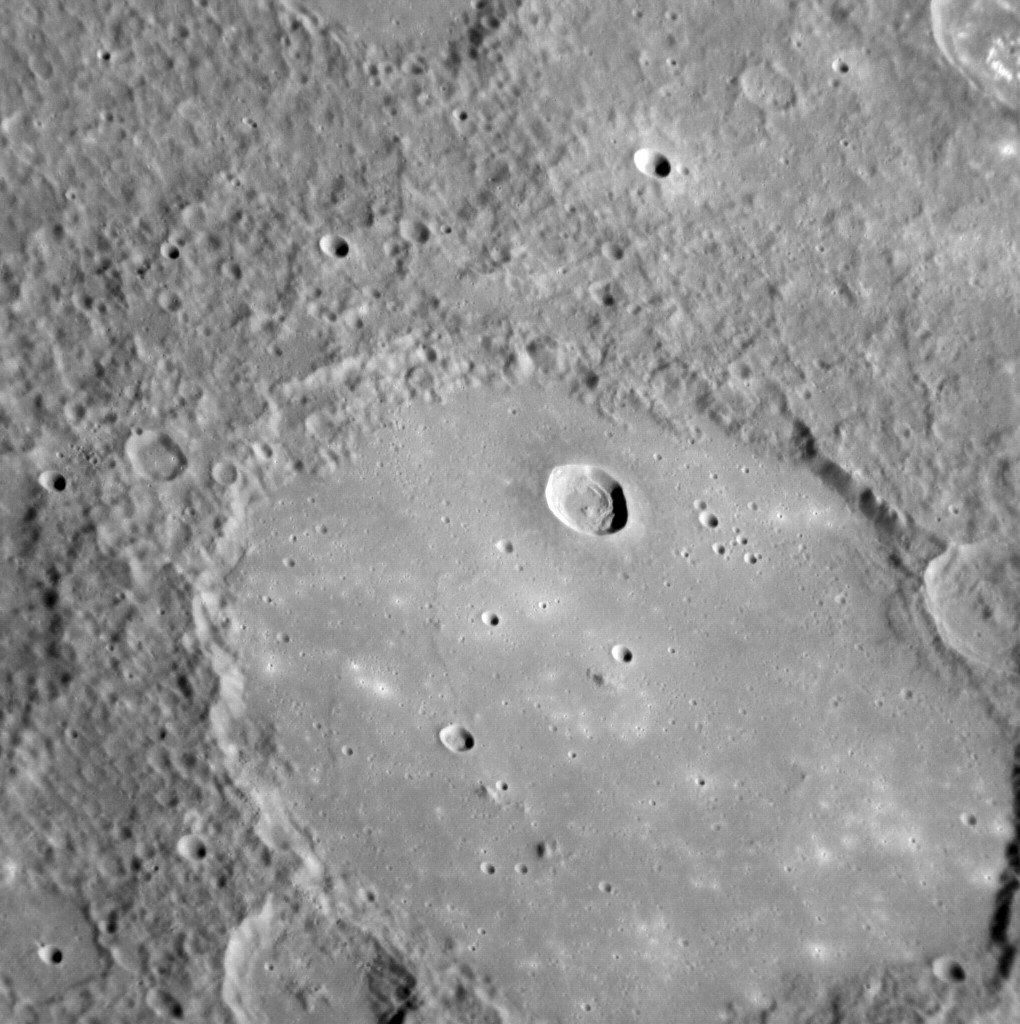
Oblique MESSENGER image
