= Popova (crater) =

Crater on Mercury

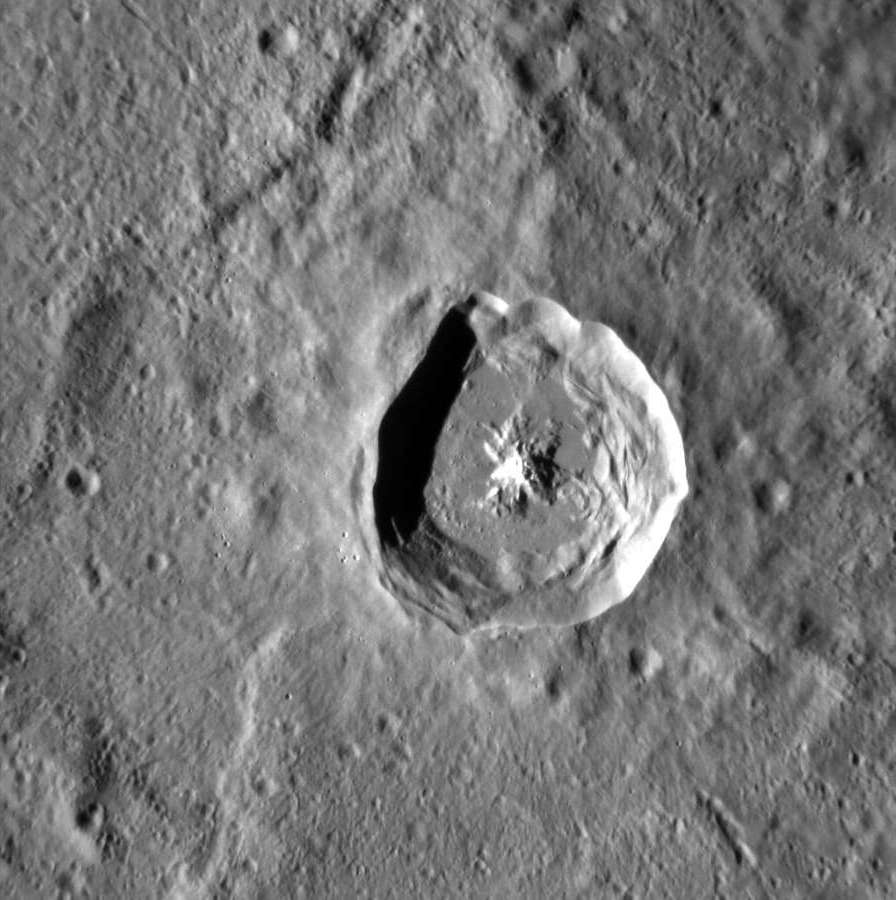
- MESSENGER image
- Planet: Mercury
- Coordinates: 34.72°S 66.73°W
- Quadrangle: Discovery
- Diameter: 34 km (21 mi)
- Eponym: Lyubov Popova

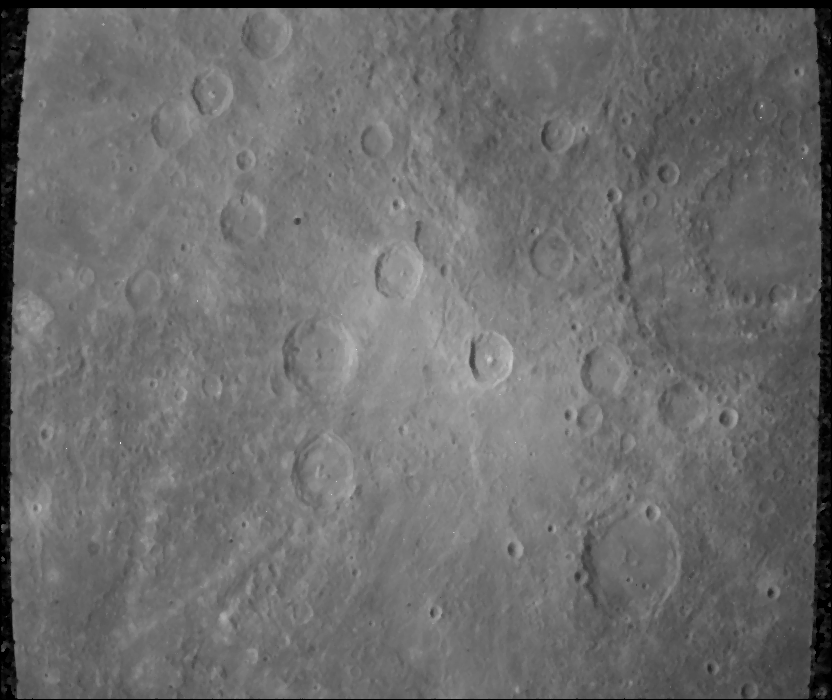
Mariner 10 image with Popova near center

Popova is a crater on Mercury. Its name was adopted by the International Astronomical Union in 2012, after the Russian painter and designer Lyubov Popova.

The crater has a central peak and has a bright ray system that overlies surrounding features and is thus young.

The peak-ring basin Chekhov is to the southeast of Popova, and the flat-floored Unkei is to the northeast.
