= Smetana (crater) =

Crater on Mercury

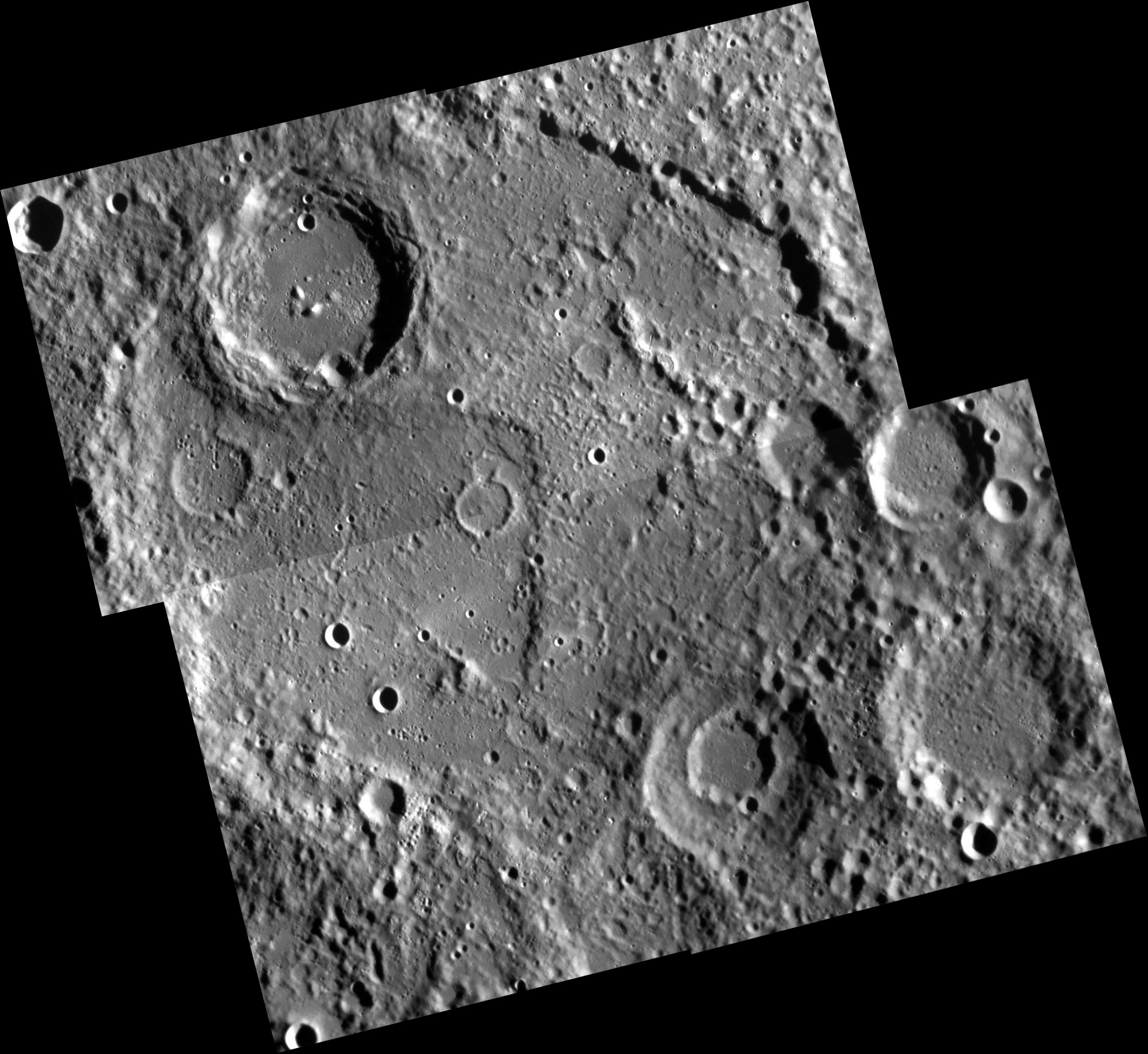
- MESSENGER NAC mosaic
- Planet: Mercury
- Coordinates: 48.25°S 70.17°W
- Quadrangle: Discovery
- Diameter: 191.0 km (118.7 mi)
- Eponym: Bedřich Smetana

Smetana is a crater on Mercury. Its name was adopted by the International Astronomical Union (IAU) in 1985. The crater is named for Czech composer Bedřich Smetana.

Smetana is highly eroded and overlain by many younger craters. Some of the mountains within the crater appear to have hollows on them, as does an unnamed crater in the northwest quadrant of Smetana.

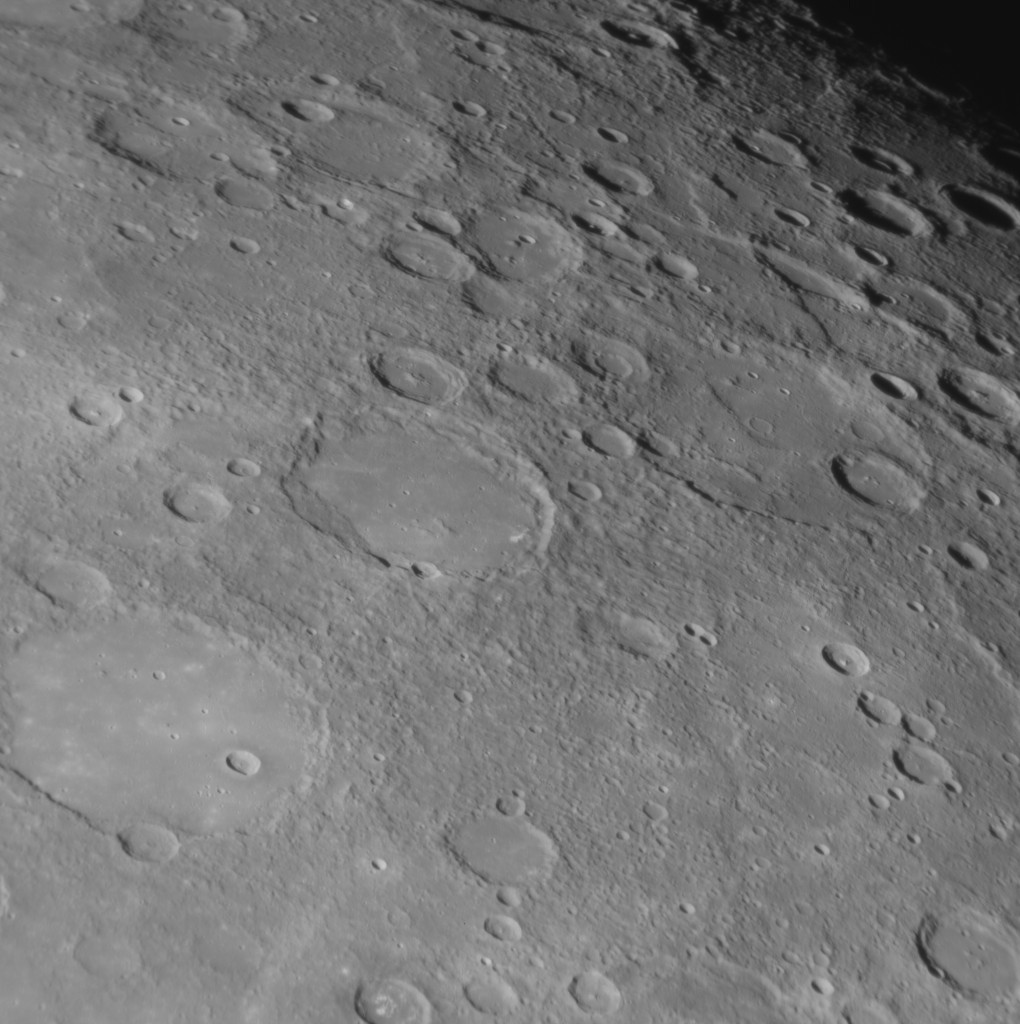
Regional view with Smetana at right, Bramante near center, and Schubert is in left foreground

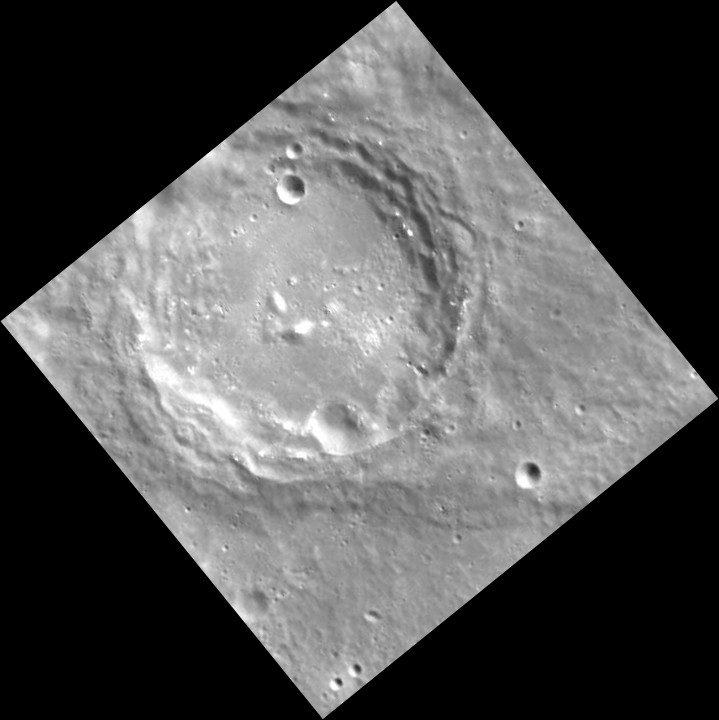
Crater within Smetana crater with hollows
