= Coleridge (crater) =

Crater on Mercury

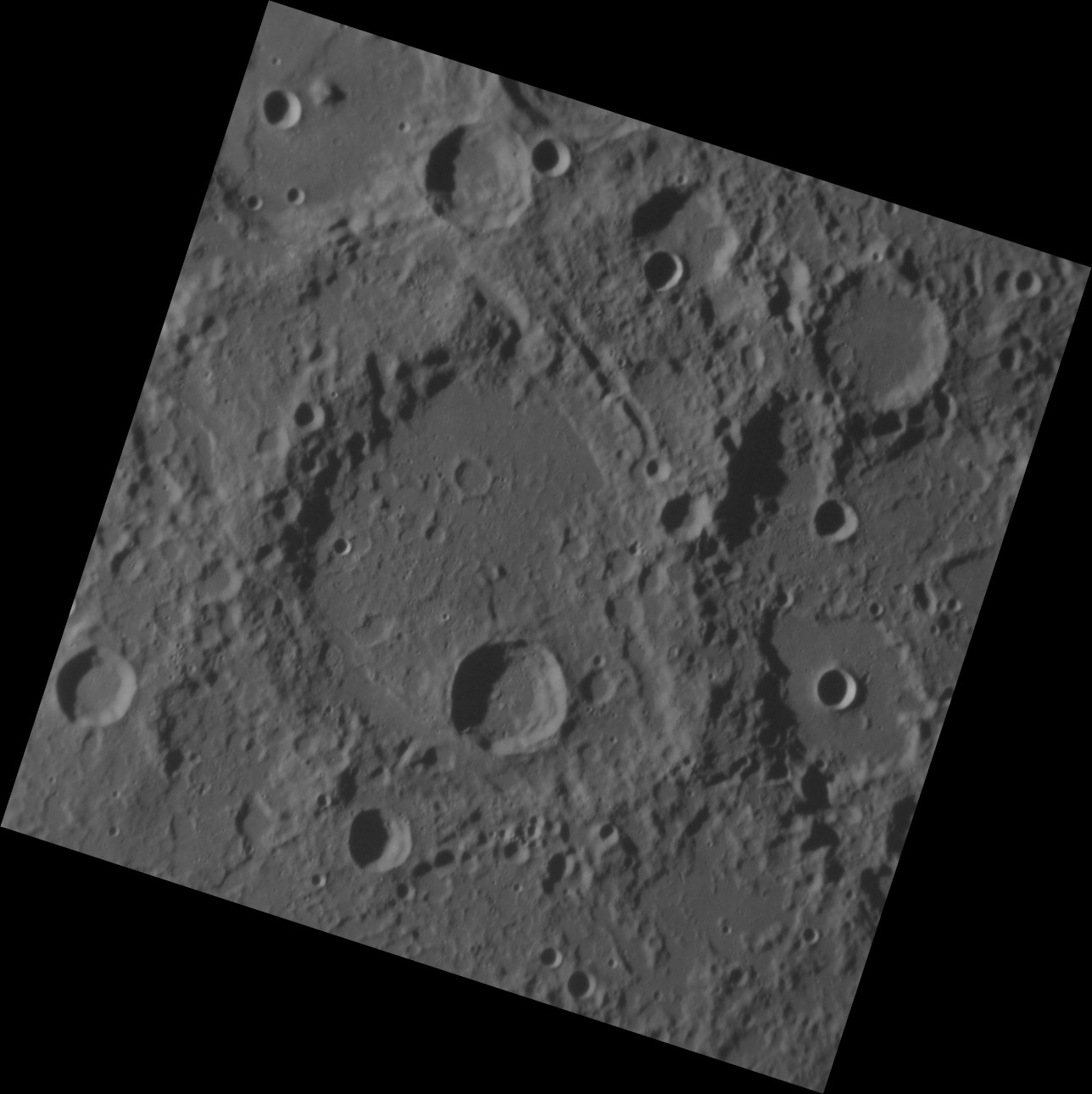
- MESSENGER NAC
- Feature type: Impact crater
- Location: Discovery quadrangle, Mercury
- Coordinates: 55.67°S 66.60°W
- Diameter: 112.0 km (69.6 mi)
- Eponym: Samuel Taylor Coleridge

Coleridge is a crater on Mercury. Its name was adopted by the International Astronomical Union (IAU) in 1976. Coleridge is named for the English poet Samuel Taylor Coleridge, who lived from 1772 to 1834.

To the south of Coleridge is Rabelais crater. To the north are Smetana and Bramante.
