= Rabelais (crater) =

Crater on Mercury

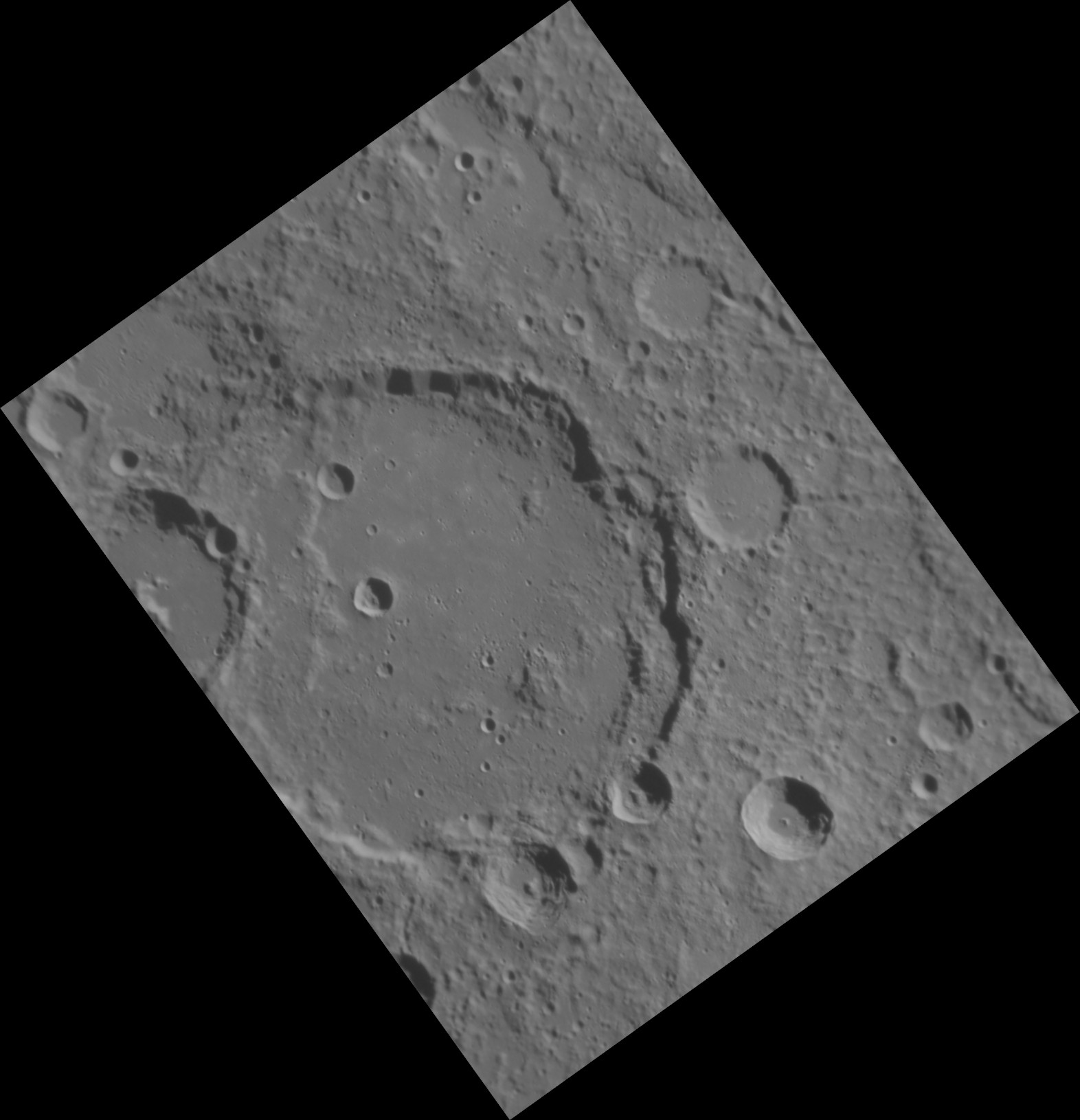
- MESSENGER NAC
- Planet: Mercury
- Coordinates: 60.53°S 61.81°W
- Quadrangle: Discovery
- Diameter: 154 km (96 mi)
- Eponym: François Rabelais

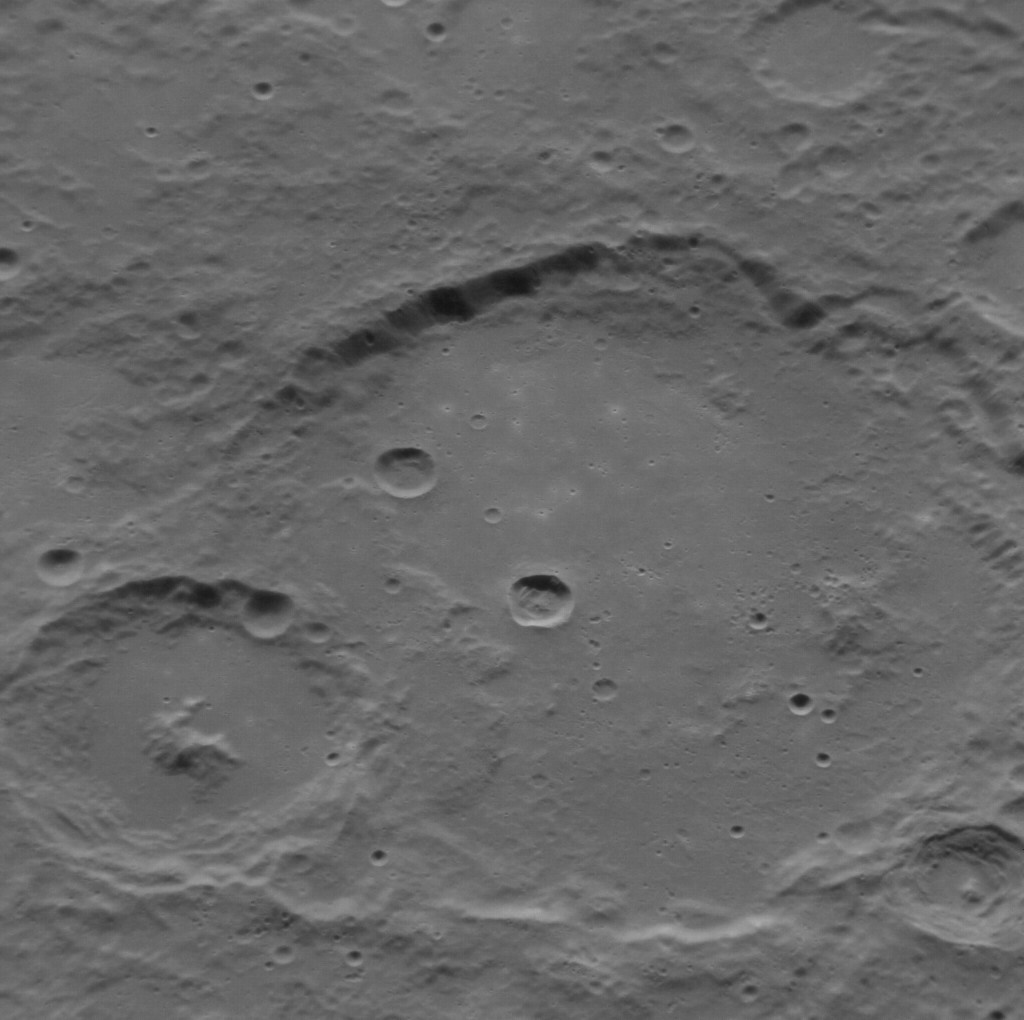
Oblique view

Rabelais is a crater on Mercury. It has a diameter of 154 kilometres (96 miles). Its name was adopted by the International Astronomical Union (IAU) in 1976. Rabelais is named for the French writer François Rabelais.

The crater Ma Chih-Yuan is to the west of Rabelais, Coleridge is to the north, and Khansa is to the east.

The scarps of Adventure Rupes are to the south. A scarp that is informally named Rabelais Dorsum cuts across Adventure Rupes.
