= Sei (crater) =

Crater on Mercury

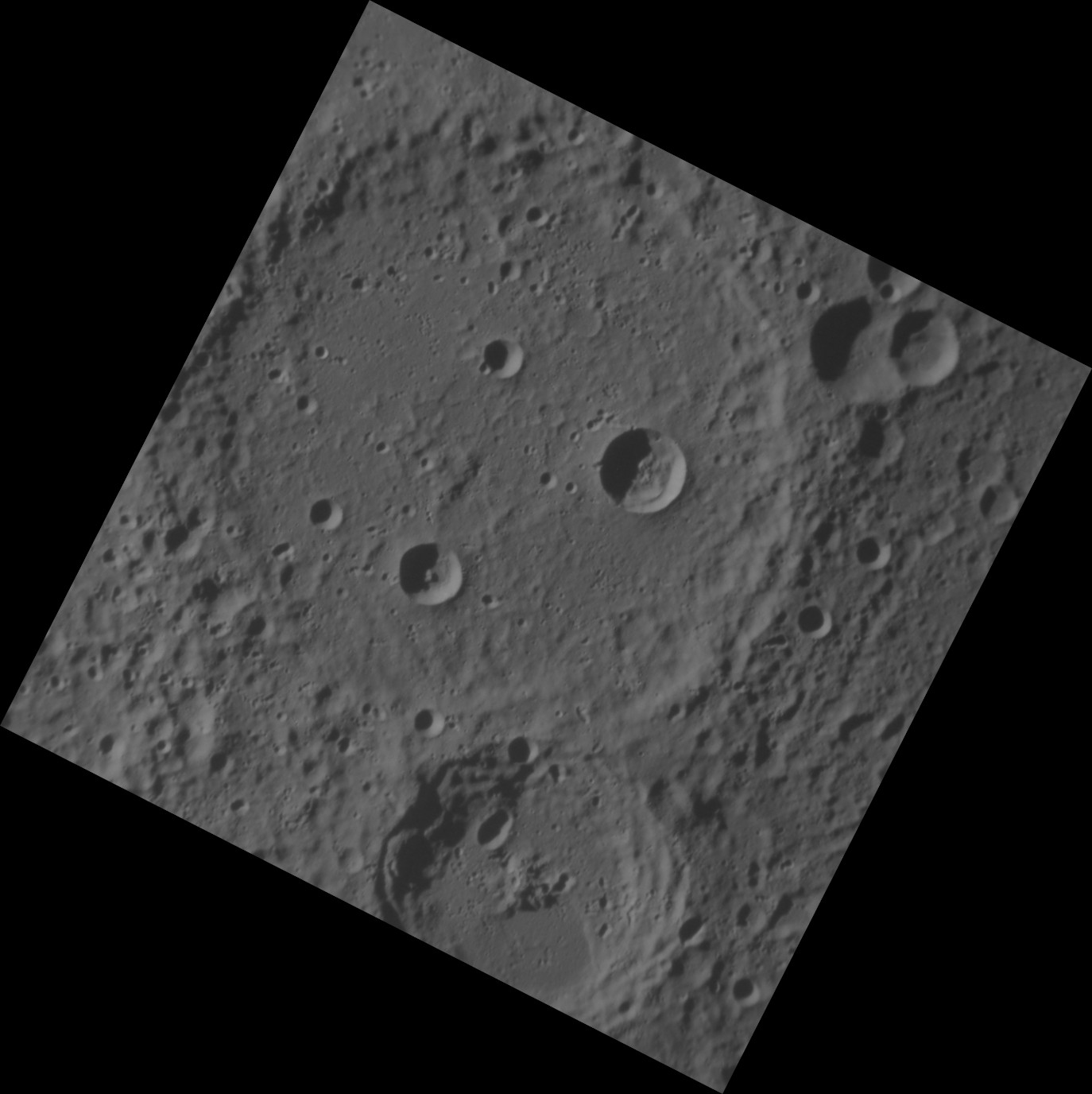
- MESSENGER NAC
- Planet: Mercury
- Coordinates: 64.61°S 88.59°W
- Quadrangle: Discovery
- Diameter: 137 km (85 mi)
- Eponym: Sei Shōnagon

Sei is a crater on Mercury. Its name was adopted by the International Astronomical Union (IAU) in 1976. The crater is named for Japanese writer Sei Shōnagon.

To the west of Sei is Alencar crater. To the northeast is Ma Chih-Yuan crater.

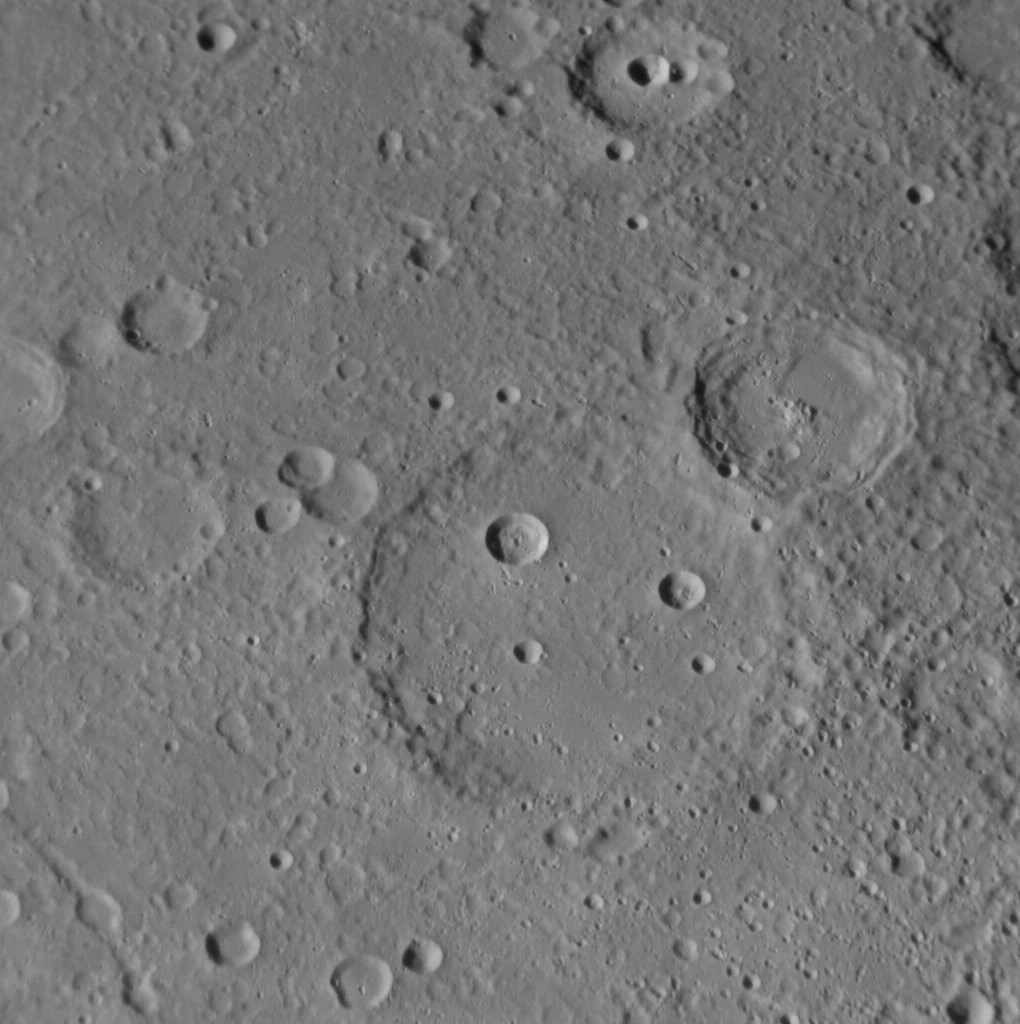
Oblique view, looking south
