= Ovid (crater) =

Crater on Mercury

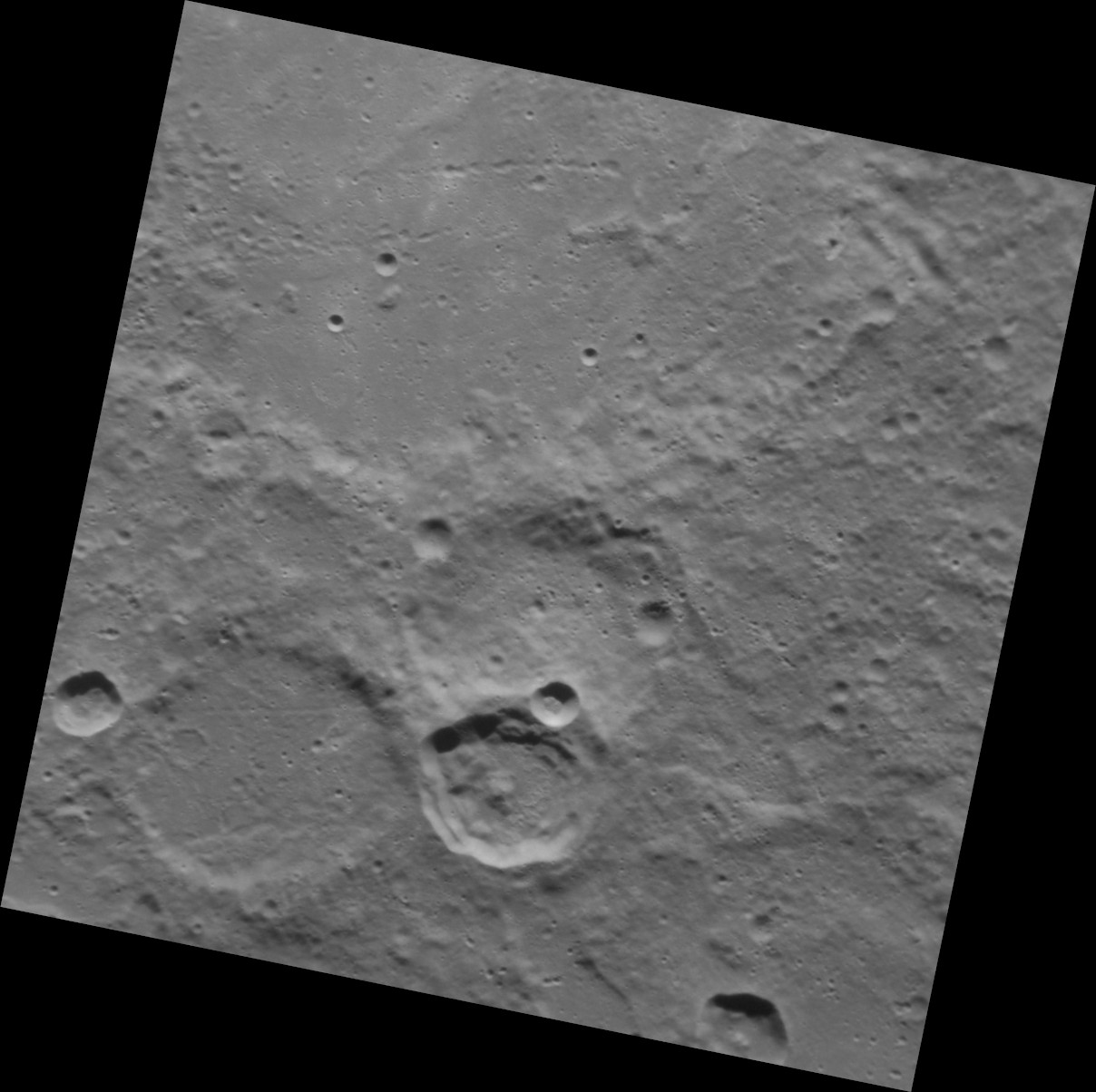
- MESSENGER NAC image of Ovid crater (bottom center) and part of Pushkin crater (top)
- Feature type: Impact crater
- Location: Bach quadrangle, Mercury
- Coordinates: 69.77°S 20.23°W
- Diameter: 41.0 km (25.5 mi)
- Eponym: Ovid

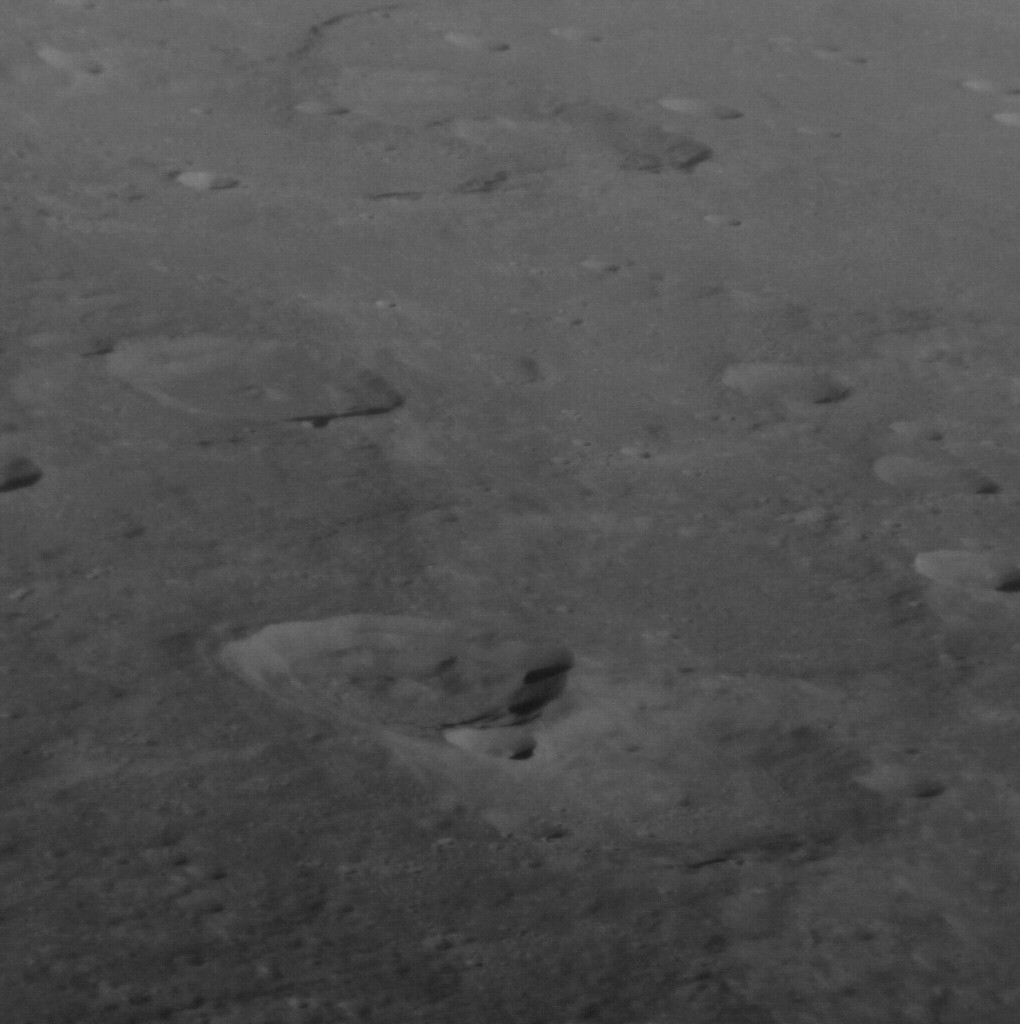
Oblique view of Ovid crater

Ovid is a crater on Mercury. Its name was adopted by the International Astronomical Union (IAU) in 1976. Ovid is named for the Roman poet Ovid, who lived from 43 BCE to 17 CE.

Ovid is south of the large crater Pushkin.
