= Chekhov (crater) =

Crater on Mercury

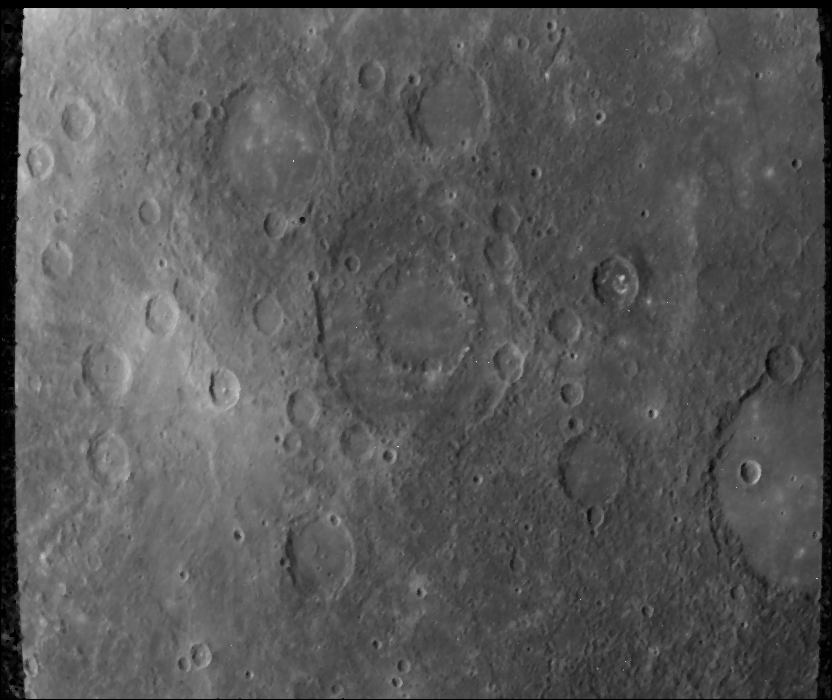
- Mariner 10 image with Chekhov at center
- Feature type: Peak-ring impact basin
- Location: Discovery quadrangle, Mercury
- Coordinates: 36.2°S 61.5°W
- Diameter: 194 km
- Eponym: Anton Chekhov

Chekhov is a crater on Mercury. It has a diameter of 194 kilometers. Its name was adopted by the International Astronomical Union (IAU) in 1976. Chekhov is named for the Russian author Anton Chekhov, who lived from 1860 to 1904.

Chekhov is one of 110 peak ring basins on Mercury. On the eastern side of the peak ring is a dark spot of low reflectance material (LRM), closely associated with hollows. There is evidence of explosive volcanism on the floor of the crater, based on the presence of an irregular depression along the southern inner peak ring.

The small rayed crater Popova is to the west of Chekhov. Unkei is to the north, Wergeland is to the east, and the similar-sized crater Schubert is to the southeast.

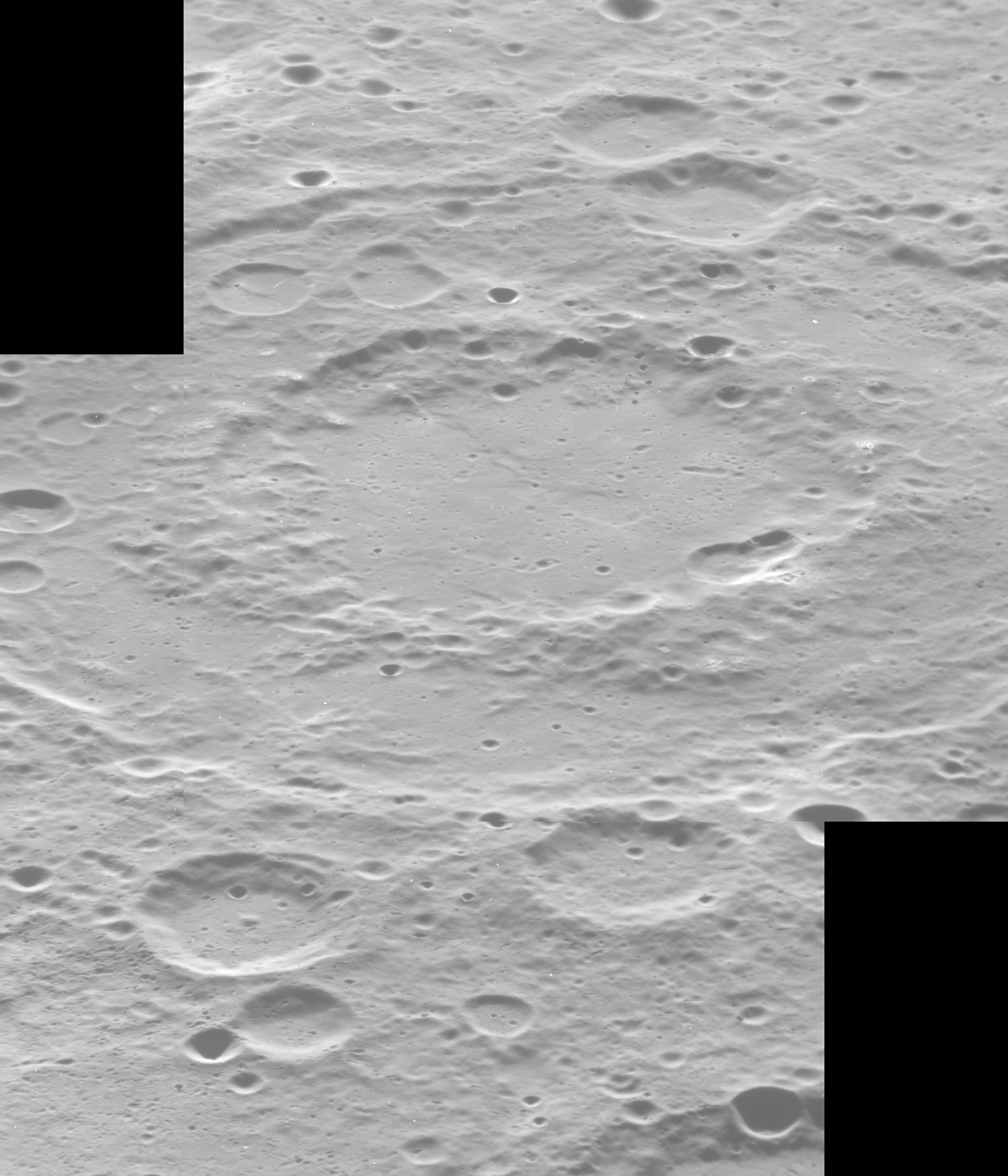
MESSENGER mosaic

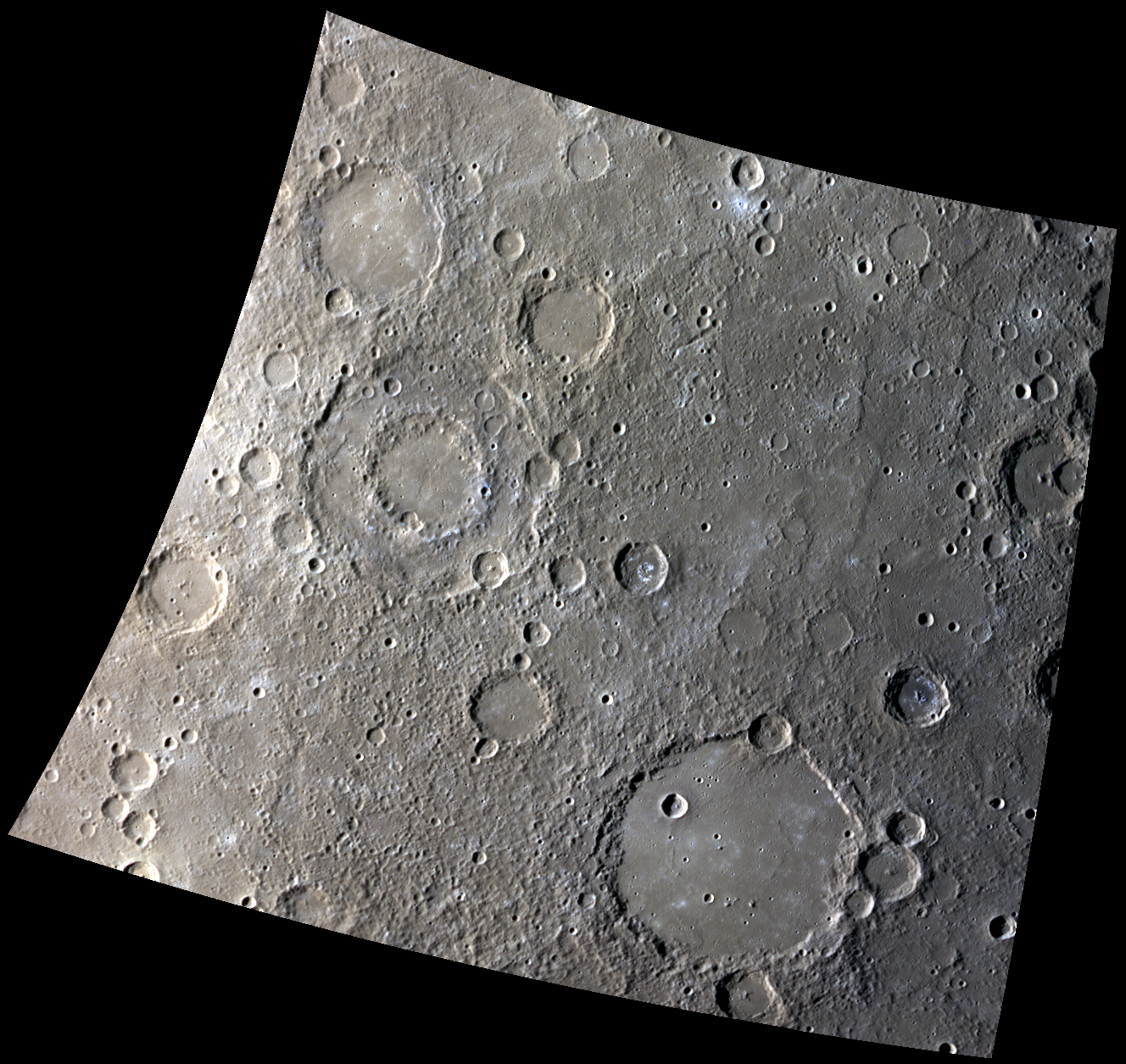
MESSENGER mosaic with Schubert at lower right and Checkhov at upper left.
