= Mendes Pinto (crater) =

Crater on Mercury

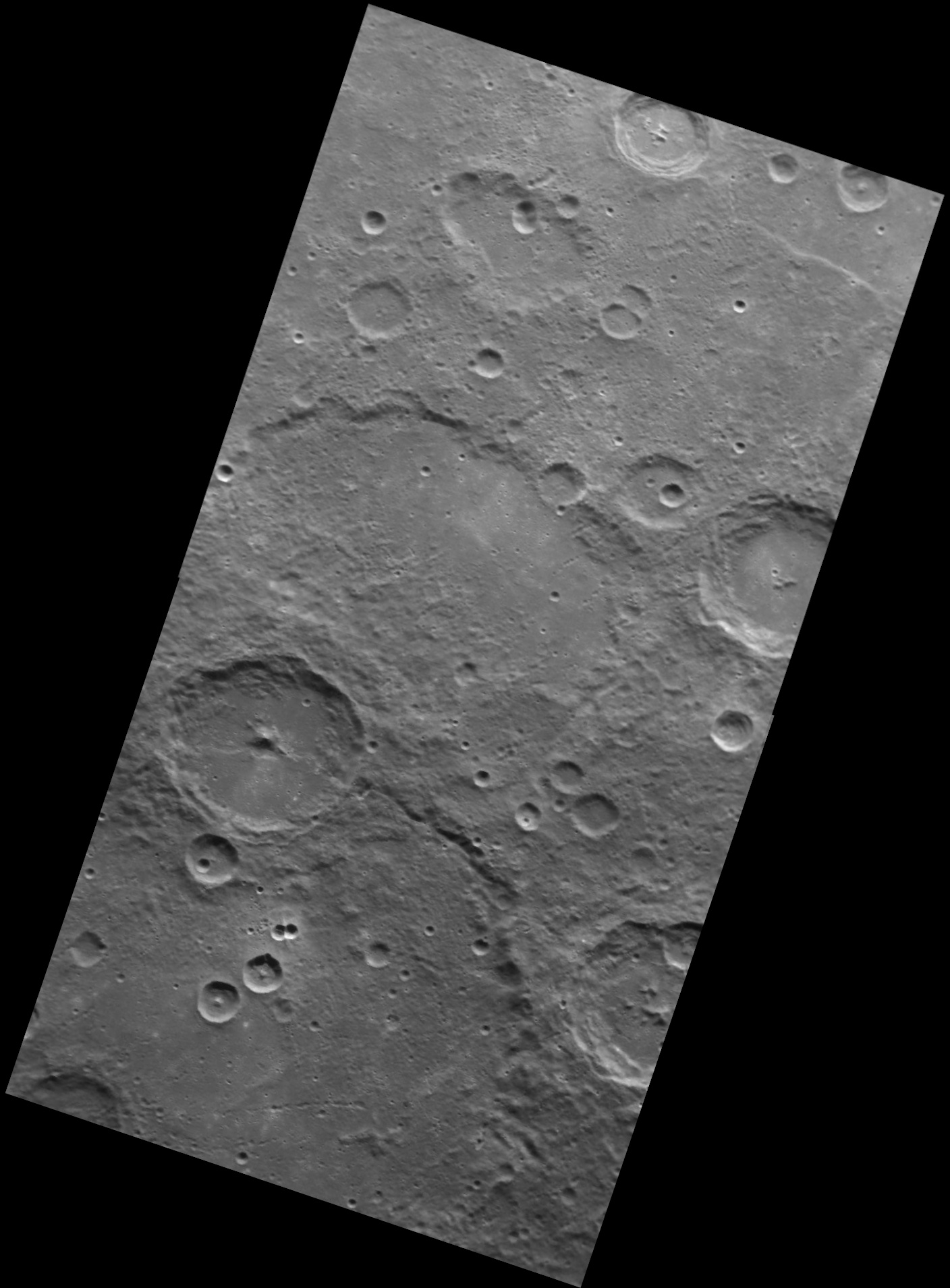
- MESSENGER NAC mosaic with Mendes Pinto at center
- Feature type: Impact crater
- Location: Discovery quadrangle, Mercury
- Coordinates: 61.65°S 17.57°W
- Diameter: 192 km (119 mi)
- Eponym: Fernão Mendes Pinto

Mendes Pinto is a crater on Mercury. Its name was adopted by the International Astronomical Union (IAU) in 1976. Mendes Pinto is named for the Portuguese explorer and prose author Fernão Mendes Pinto, who lived from 1510 to 1583.

Mendes Pinto is highly eroded by subsequent impacts. The southwest rim of Mendes Pinto is overlain by the crater Tsurayuki.
