= Po Ya (crater) =

Crater on Mercury

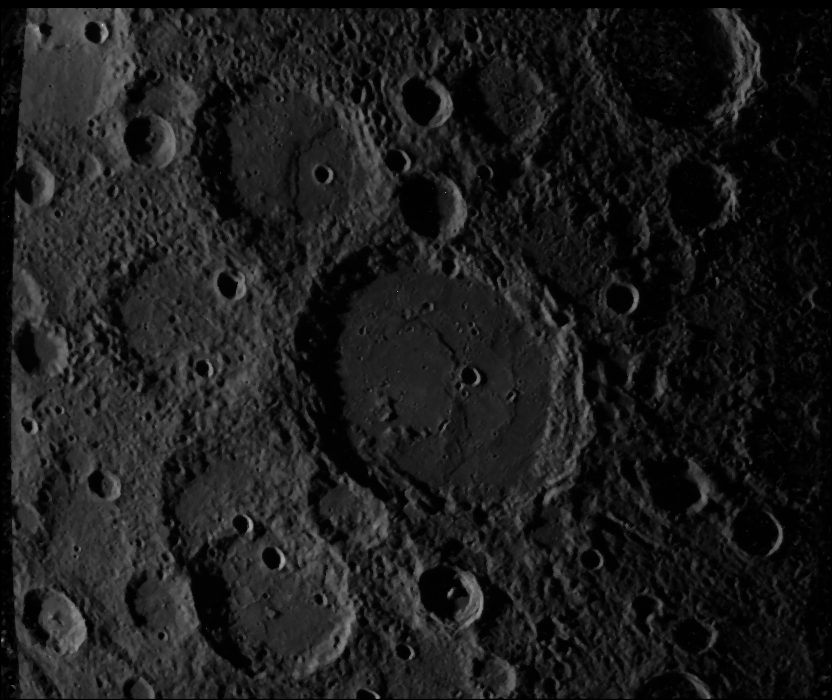
- Mariner 10 image with Po Ya in upper left
- Planet: Mercury
- Coordinates: 45.92°S 20.17°W
- Quadrangle: Discovery
- Diameter: 101 km (63 mi)
- Eponym: Bo Ya

Po Ya is a crater on Mercury. Its name was adopted by the IAU in 1976, after Bo Ya, a Chinese musician who lived in 8th century B.C. The crater was first imaged by Mariner 10 in 1974.

Po Ya is northwest of the larger crater Sōtatsu and northeast of Tintoretto crater.

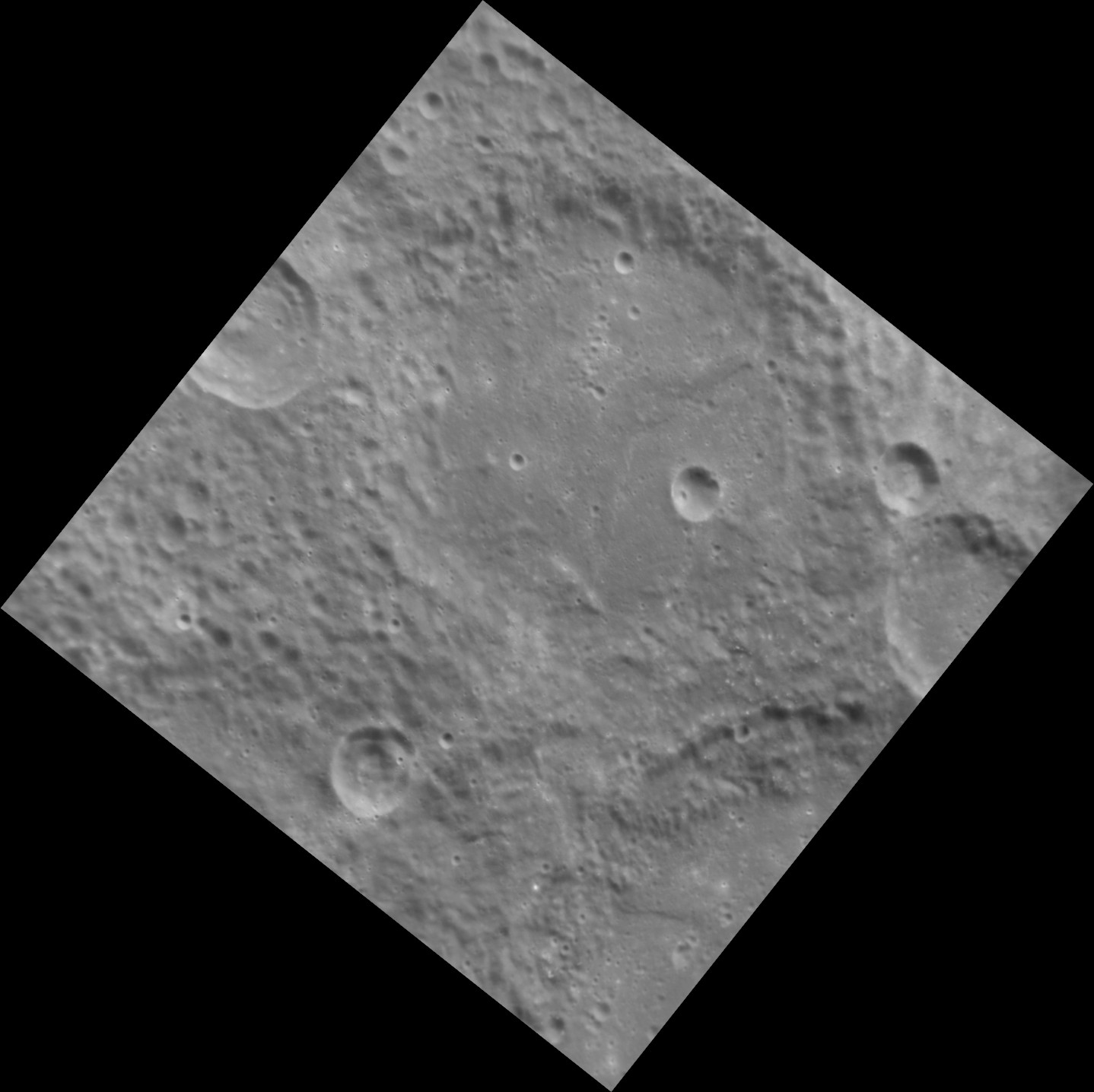
MESSENGER image
