= Tintoretto (crater) =

Crater on Mercury

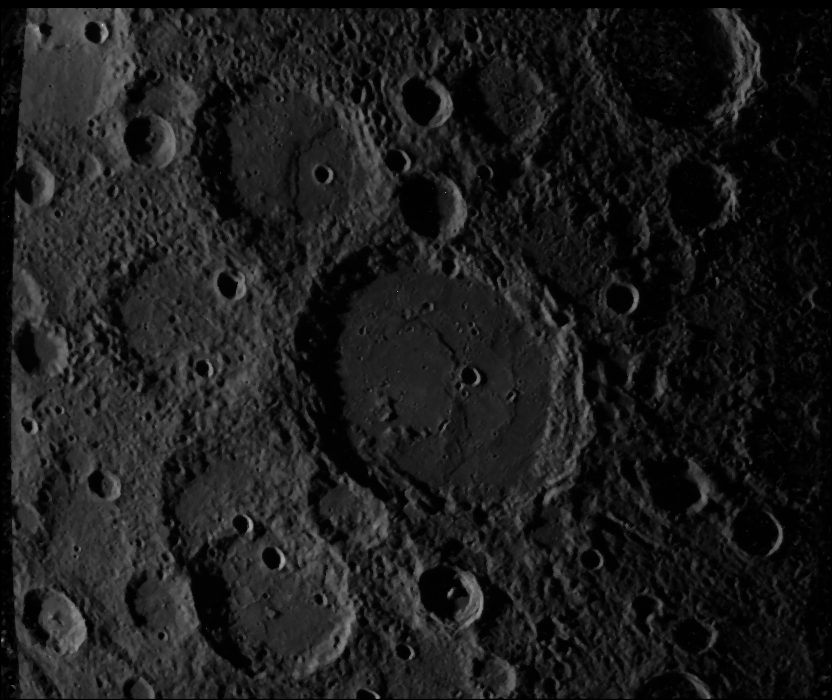
- Mariner 10 image with Tintoretto left of center
- Planet: Mercury
- Coordinates: 47.99°S 22.95°W
- Quadrangle: Discovery
- Diameter: 94 km (58 mi)
- Eponym: Tintoretto

Tintoretto is a crater on Mercury. Its name was adopted by the IAU in 1976, after the Italian painter Tintoretto. The crater was first imaged by Mariner 10 in 1974.

Tintoretto is west of the larger crater Sōtatsu and southwest of Po Ya crater.

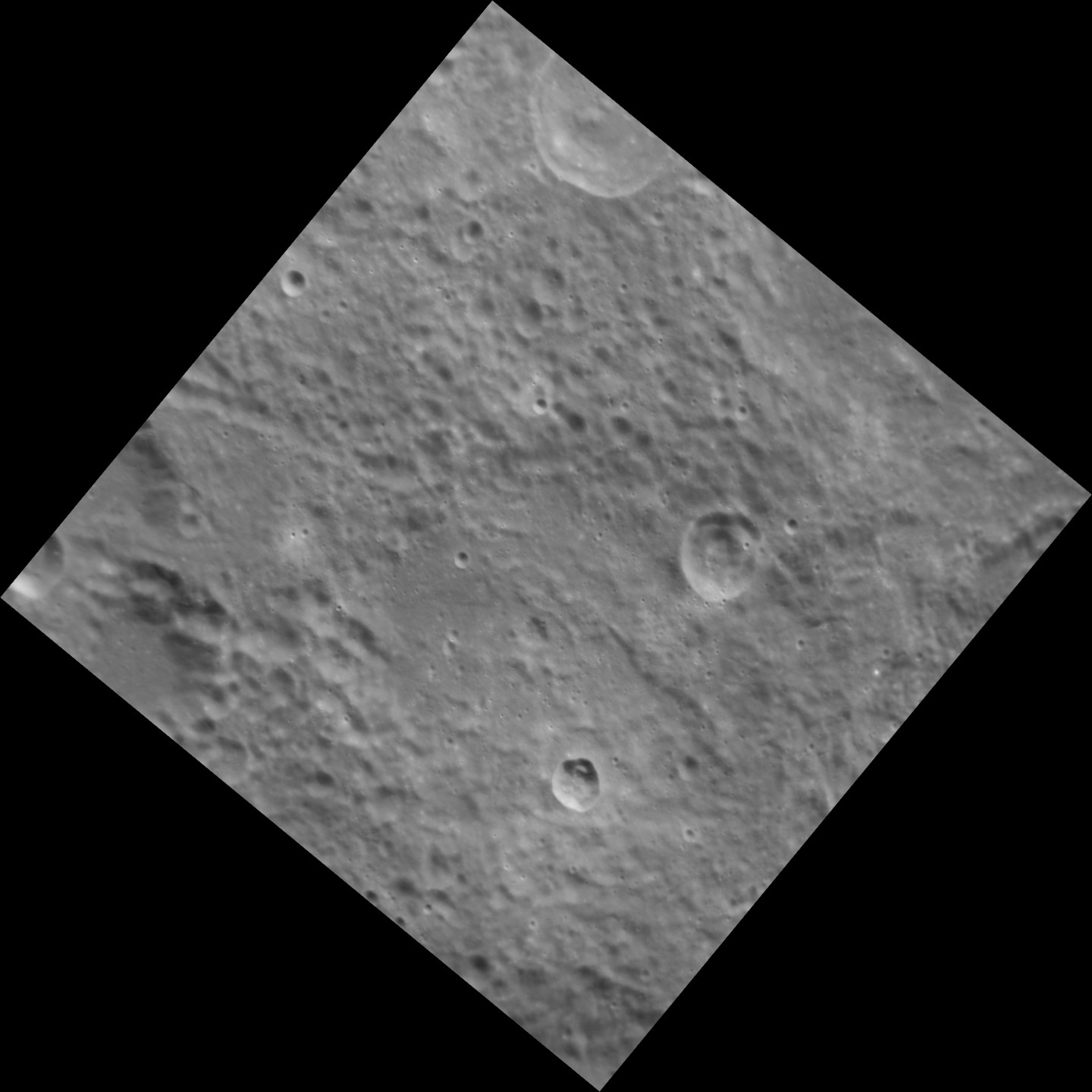
MESSENGER image
