= Pushkin (crater) =

Crater on Mercury

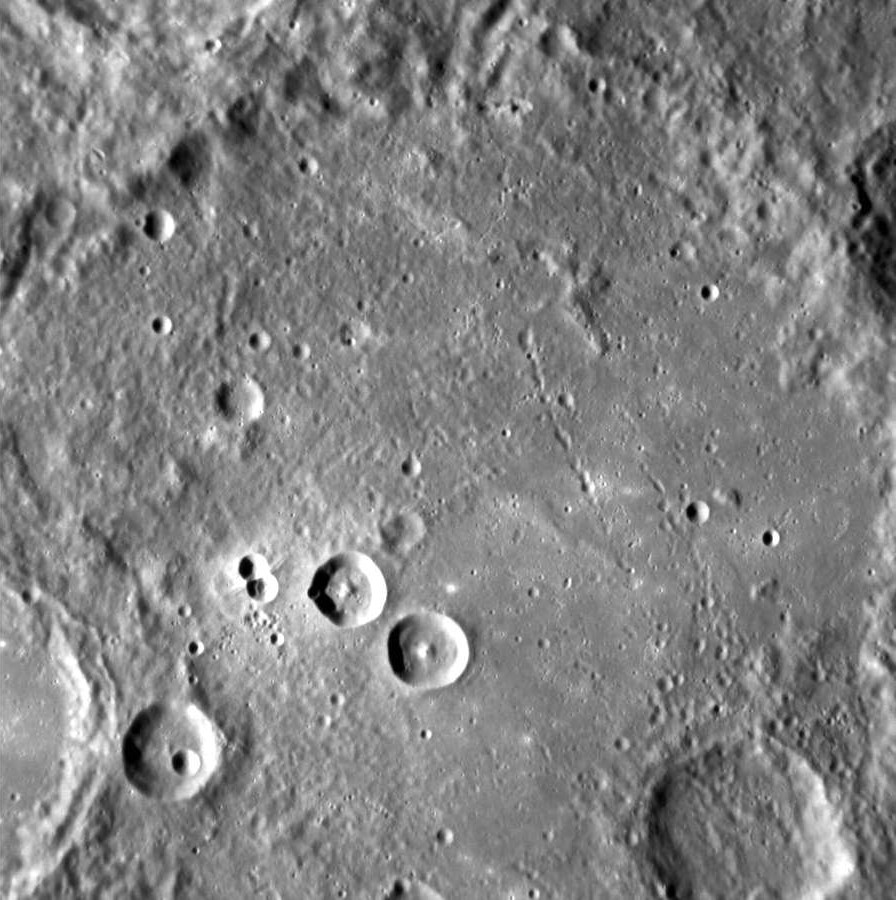
- MESSENGER NAC showing the central crater and its eastern rim
- Planet: Mercury
- Coordinates: 65.79°S 20.73°W
- Quadrangle: Discovery
- Diameter: 232 km (144 mi)
- Eponym: Alexander Pushkin

Pushkin is a crater on Mercury. Its name was adopted by the International Astronomical Union (IAU) in 1976. Pushkin is named after Russian poet Alexander Pushkin.

Pushkin lies south of the Tsurayuki crater, and north of the Ovid crater. The craters are named after 10th century Japanese poet Ki no Tsurayuki, and 1st century BC Roman poet Ovid, respectively.
