= Tsurayuki (crater) =

Crater on Mercury

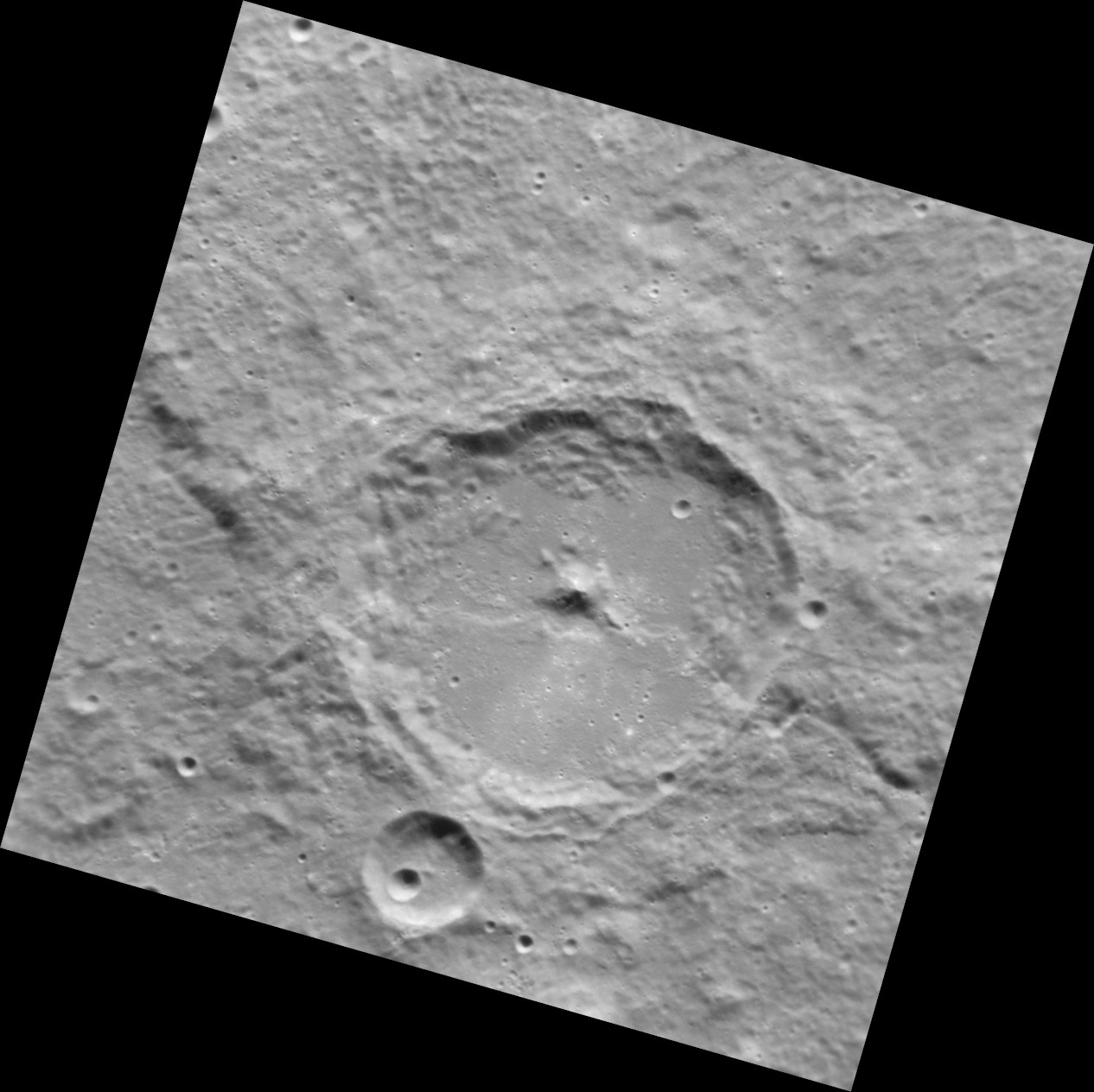
- MESSENGER NAC
- Planet: Mercury
- Coordinates: 62.99°S 20.34°W
- Quadrangle: Discovery
- Diameter: 83 km (52 mi)
- Eponym: Ki no Tsurayuki

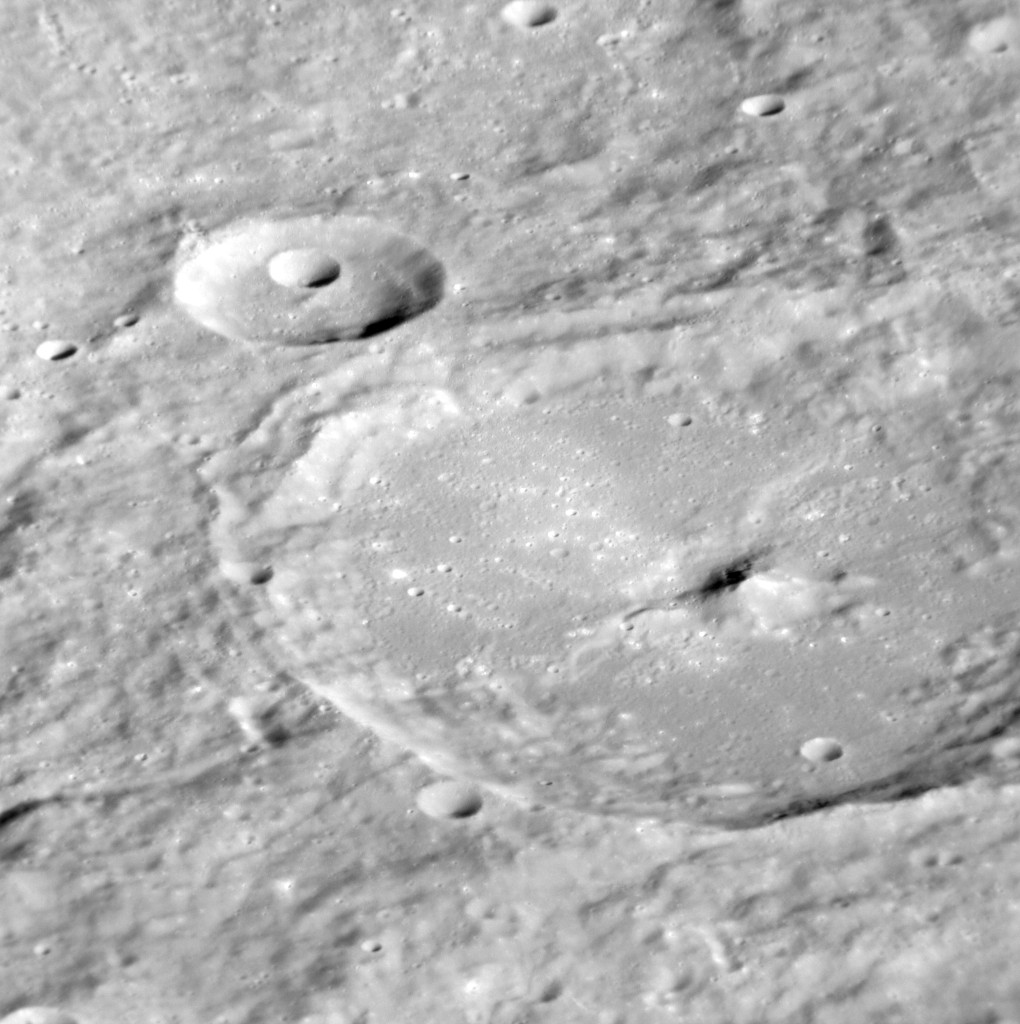
Oblique view

Tsurayuki is a crater on Mercury. Its name was adopted by the International Astronomical Union (IAU) in 1976. Tsurayuki is named for Japanese author, poet, and courtier Ki no Tsurayuki.

Tsurayuki lies on the north rim of Pushkin crater, and on the southwest rim of Mendes Pinto crater.
