= Sōtatsu (crater) =

Crater on Mercury

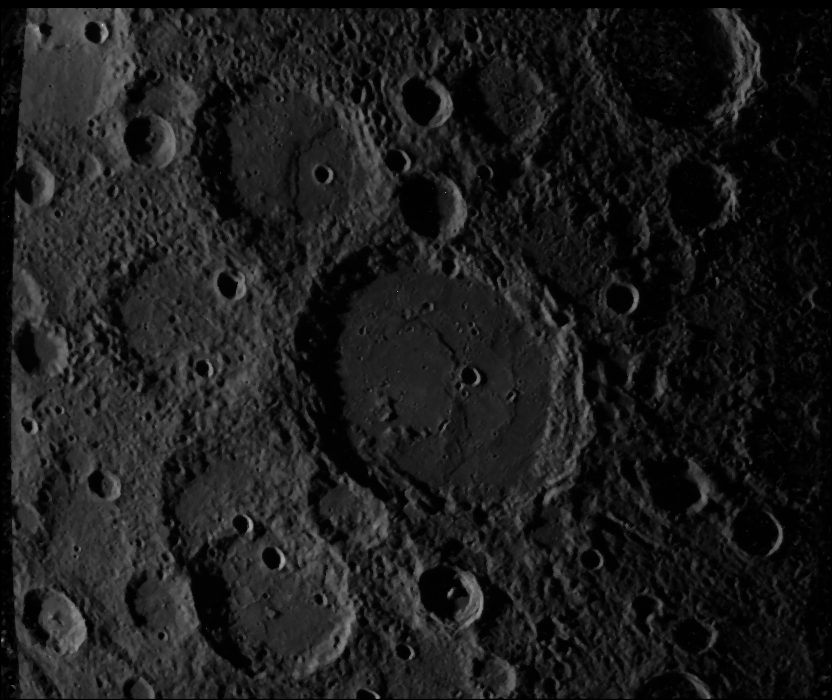
- Mariner 10 image with Sōtatsu at center
- Planet: Mercury
- Coordinates: 48.73°S 18.17°W
- Quadrangle: Discovery
- Diameter: 157 km (98 mi)
- Eponym: Tawaraya Sōtatsu

Sōtatsu is a crater on Mercury. Its name was adopted by the IAU in 1976, after the Japanese artist Tawaraya Sōtatsu. The crater was first imaged by Mariner 10 in 1974.

The craters Tintoretto and Po Ya are to the northwest of Sōtatsu.

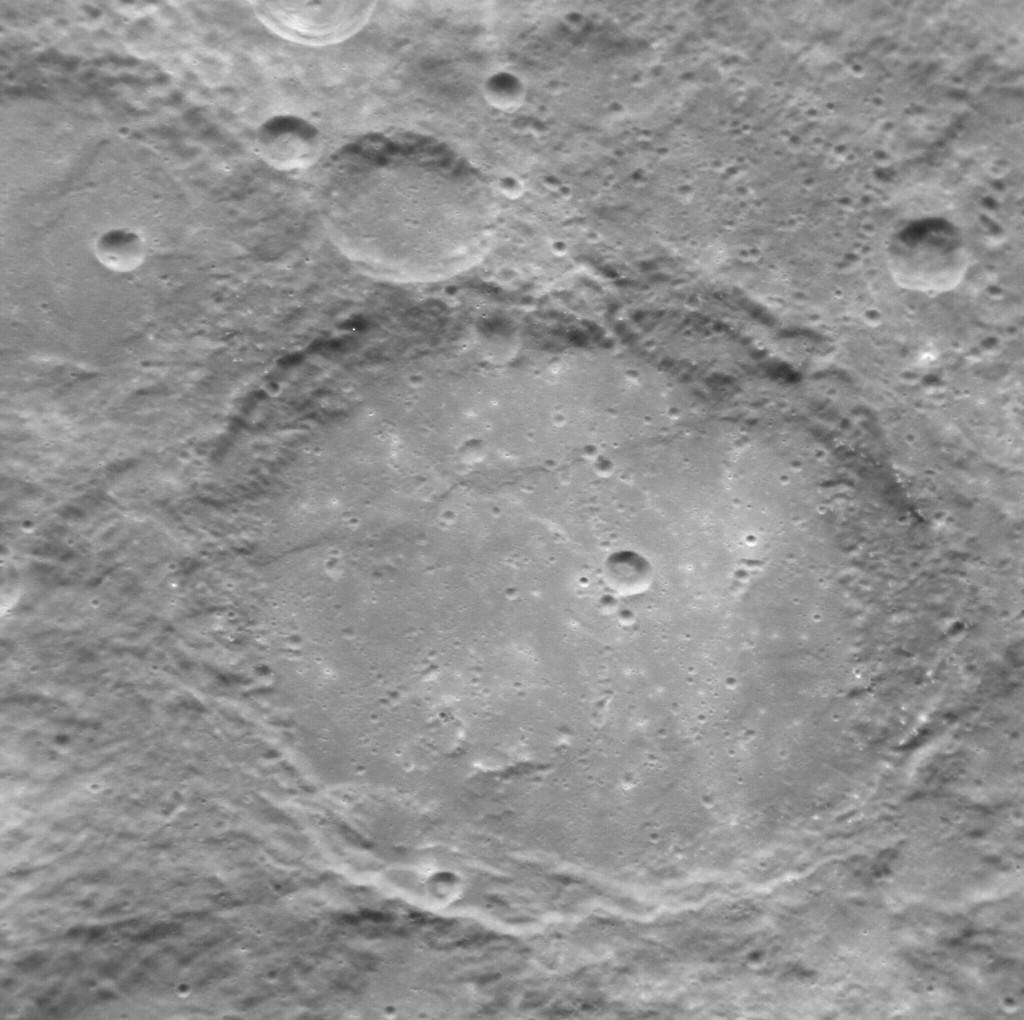
MESSENGER image
