= Unkei (crater) =

Crater on Mercury

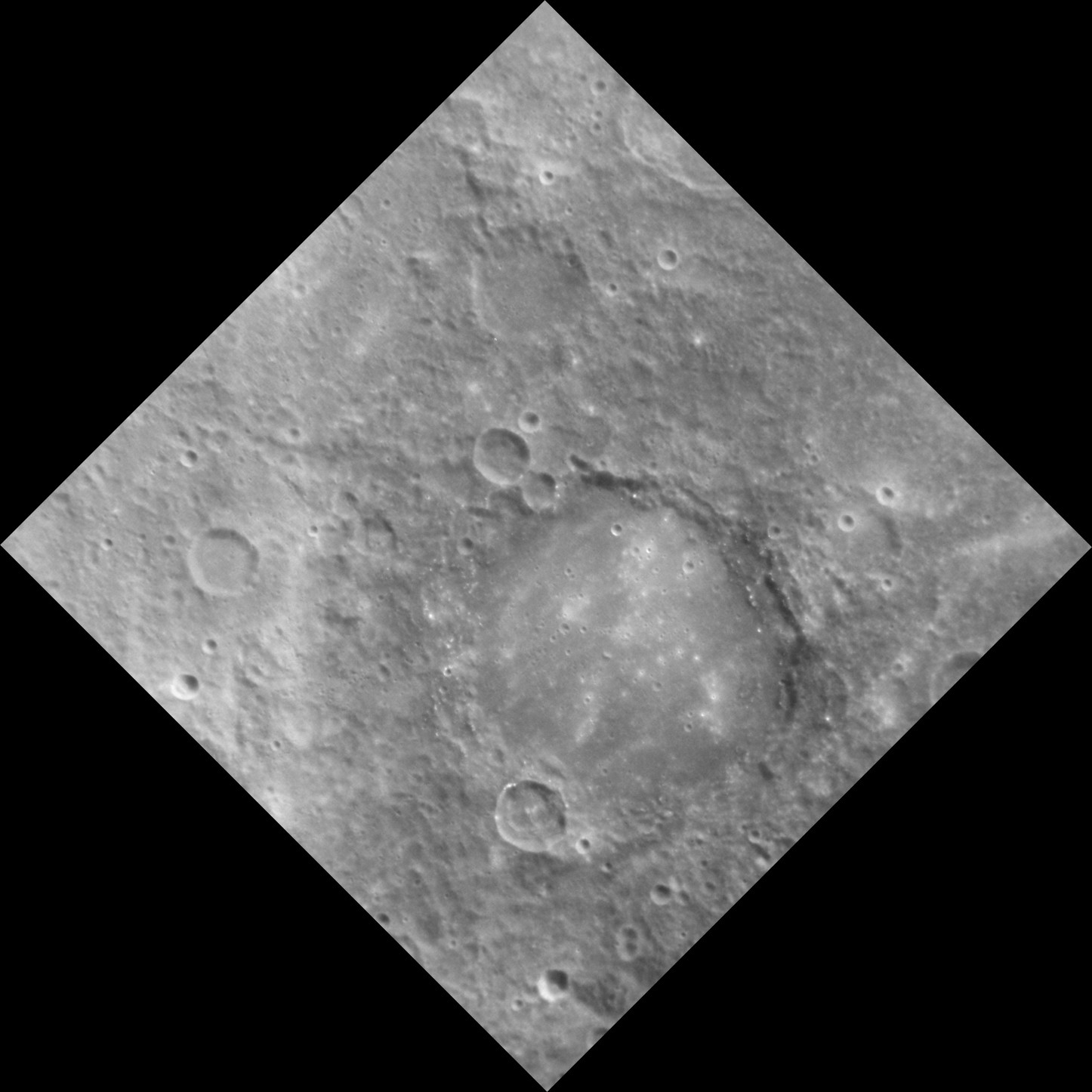
- MESSENGER NAC
- Planet: Mercury
- Coordinates: 31.79°S 62.6°W
- Quadrangle: Discovery
- Diameter: 121 km
- Eponym: Unkei

Unkei is a crater on Mercury. Its name was adopted by the International Astronomical Union in 1976, after the Japanese sculptor Unkei.

The peak-ring basin Chekhov is to the south of Unkei.

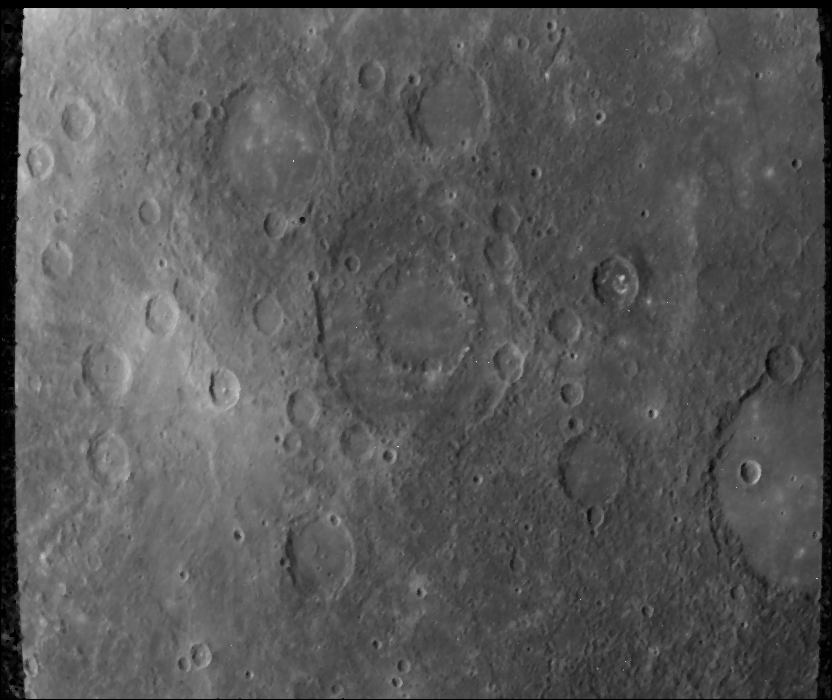
Mariner 10 image with Unkei in upper left

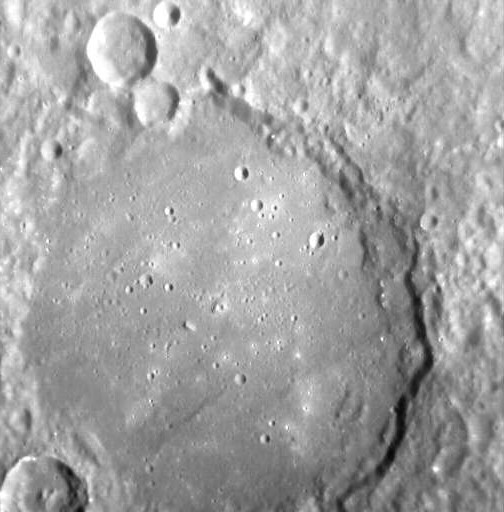
Another MESSENGER image
