= Nampeyo (crater) =

Crater on Mercury

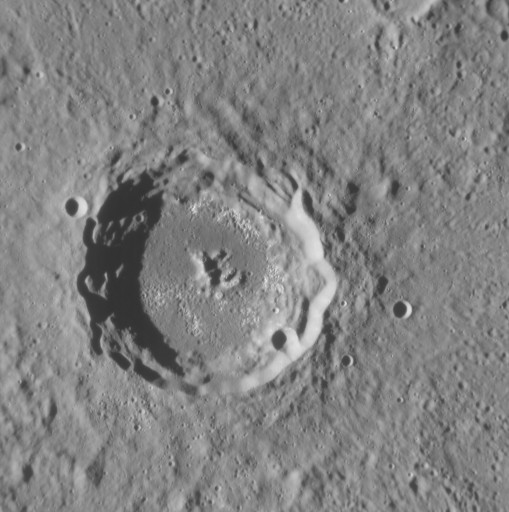
- MESSENGER NAC image of Nampeyo
- Feature type: Central-peak impact crater
- Location: Discovery quadrangle, Mercury
- Coordinates: 40.6°S 50.1°W
- Diameter: 52 km
- Eponym: Nampeyo

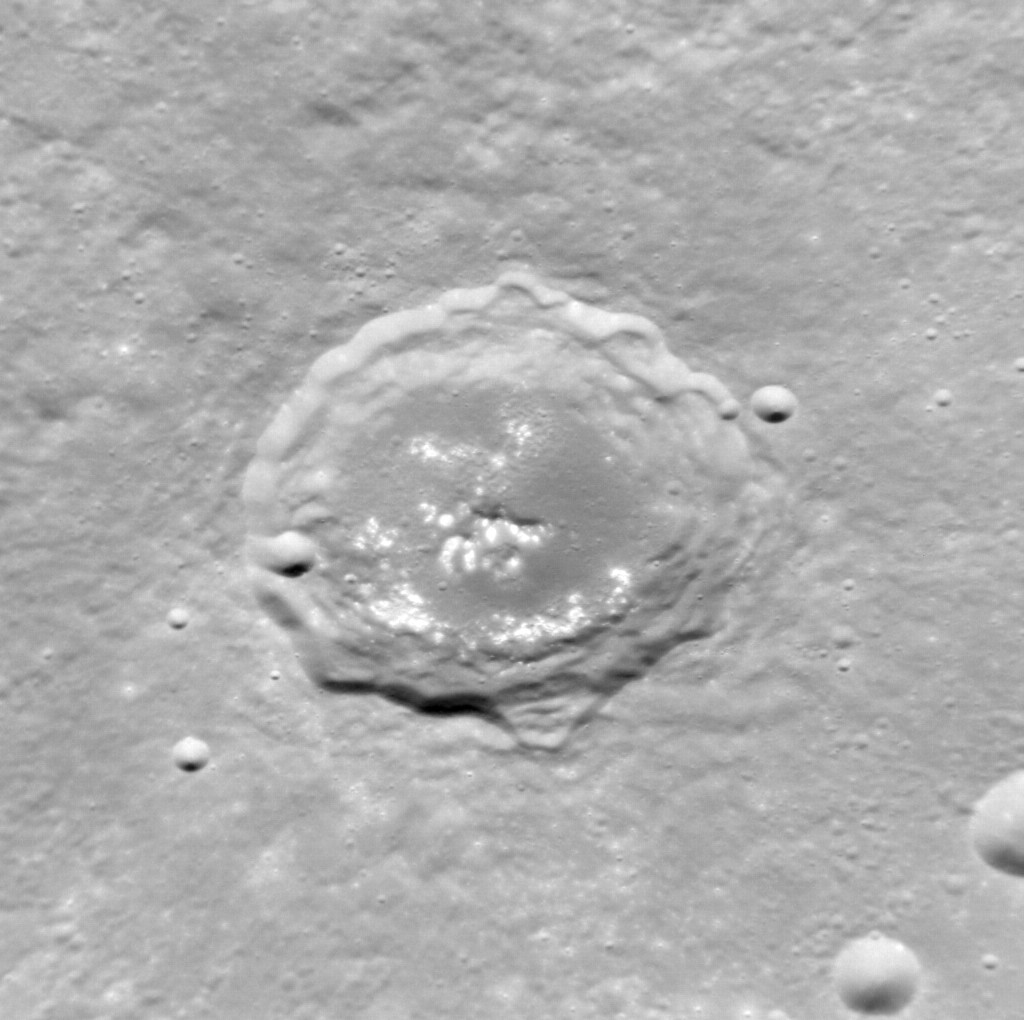
Oblique view of Nampeyo crater. The bright areas on the crater floor are hollows.

Nampeyo is a crater on Mercury. It has a diameter of 52 kilometers. Its name was adopted by the International Astronomical Union in 1976. Nampeyo is named for the Hopi-Tewa ceramics artist Nampeyo, who lived from 1860 to 1942.
