= Wergeland (crater) =

Crater on Mercury

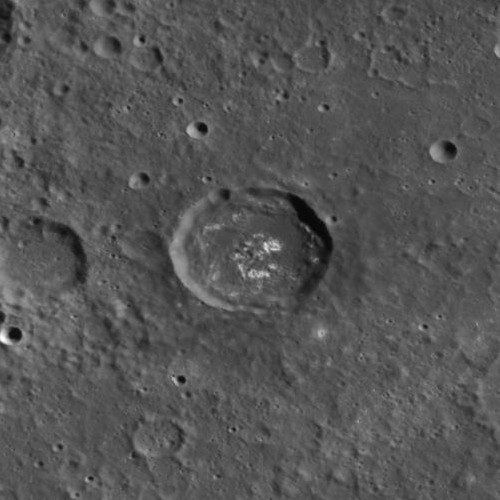
- MESSENGER WAC mosaic
- Planet: Mercury
- Coordinates: 37.93°S 56.36°W
- Quadrangle: Discovery
- Diameter: 42 km
- Eponym: Henrik Arnold Wergeland

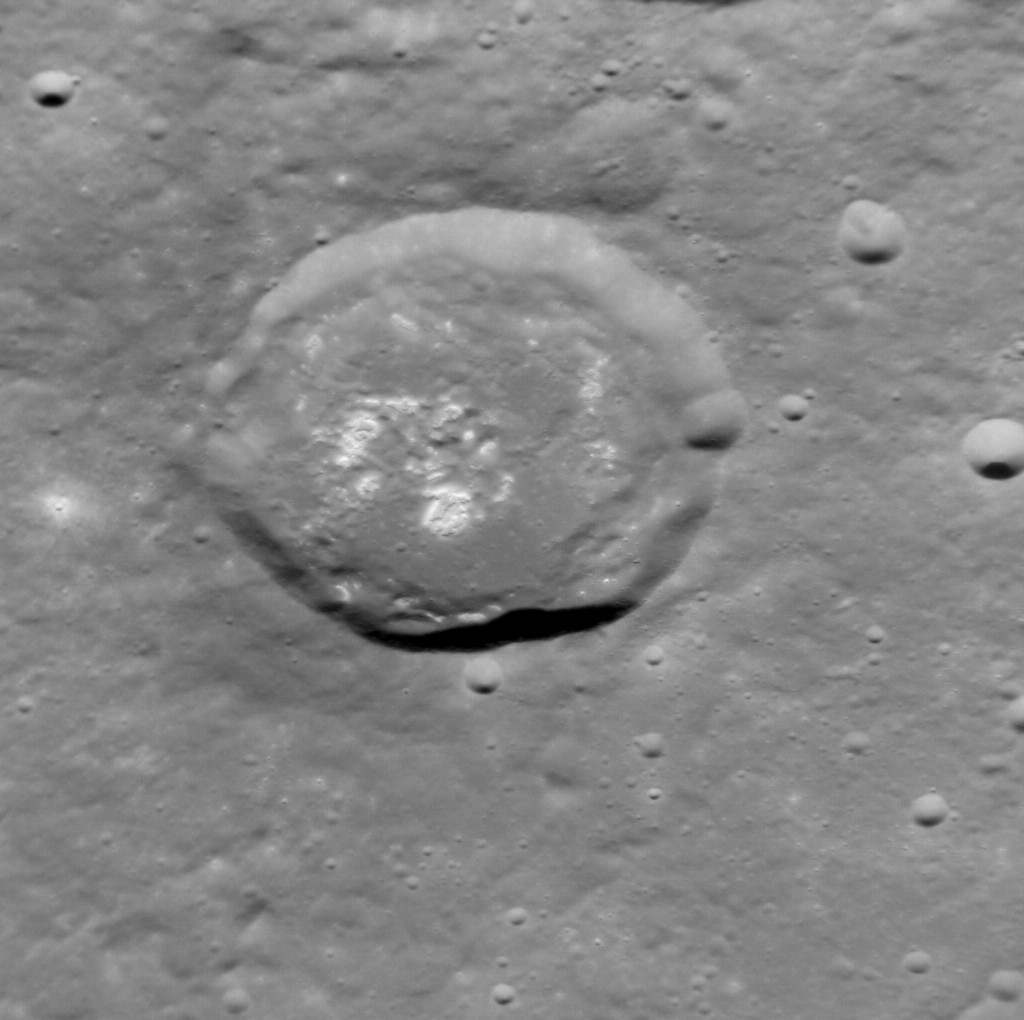
Oblique MESSENGER image

Wergeland is a crater on Mercury. Its name was adopted by the International Astronomical Union in 1976, after the Norwegian poet Henrik Arnold Wergeland.

Hollows are present within Wergeland.

The peak-ring basin Chekhov is to the west of Wergeland.
