= Bramante (crater) =

Crater on Mercury

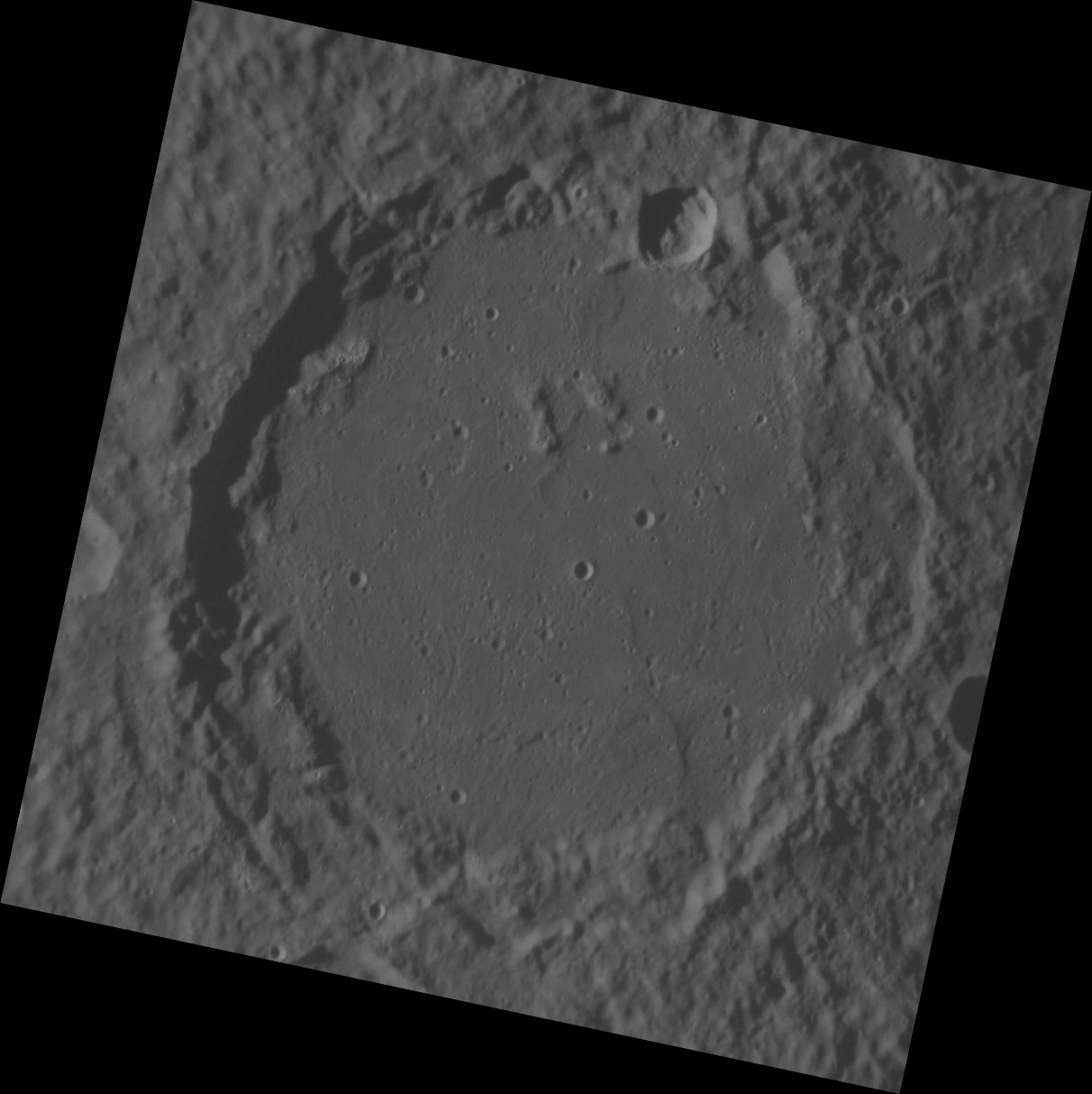
- MESSENGER NAC of Bramante
- Feature type: Impact crater
- Location: Discovery quadrangle, Mercury
- Coordinates: 47.5°S 61.8°W
- Diameter: 156 km
- Eponym: Donato Bramante

Bramante is a crater on Mercury. It has a diameter of 156 kilometers. Its name was adopted by the International Astronomical Union in 1976. Bramante is named for the Italian architect Donato Bramante, who lived from 1444 to 1514.

A single bright patch of hollows is present in the northwestern part of the crater.

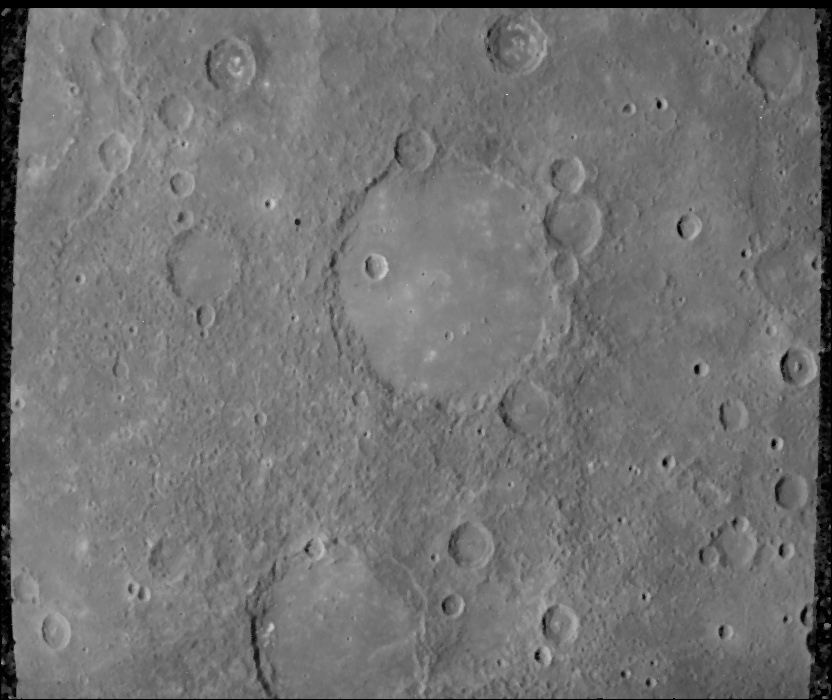
Mariner 10 image with Bramante at bottom

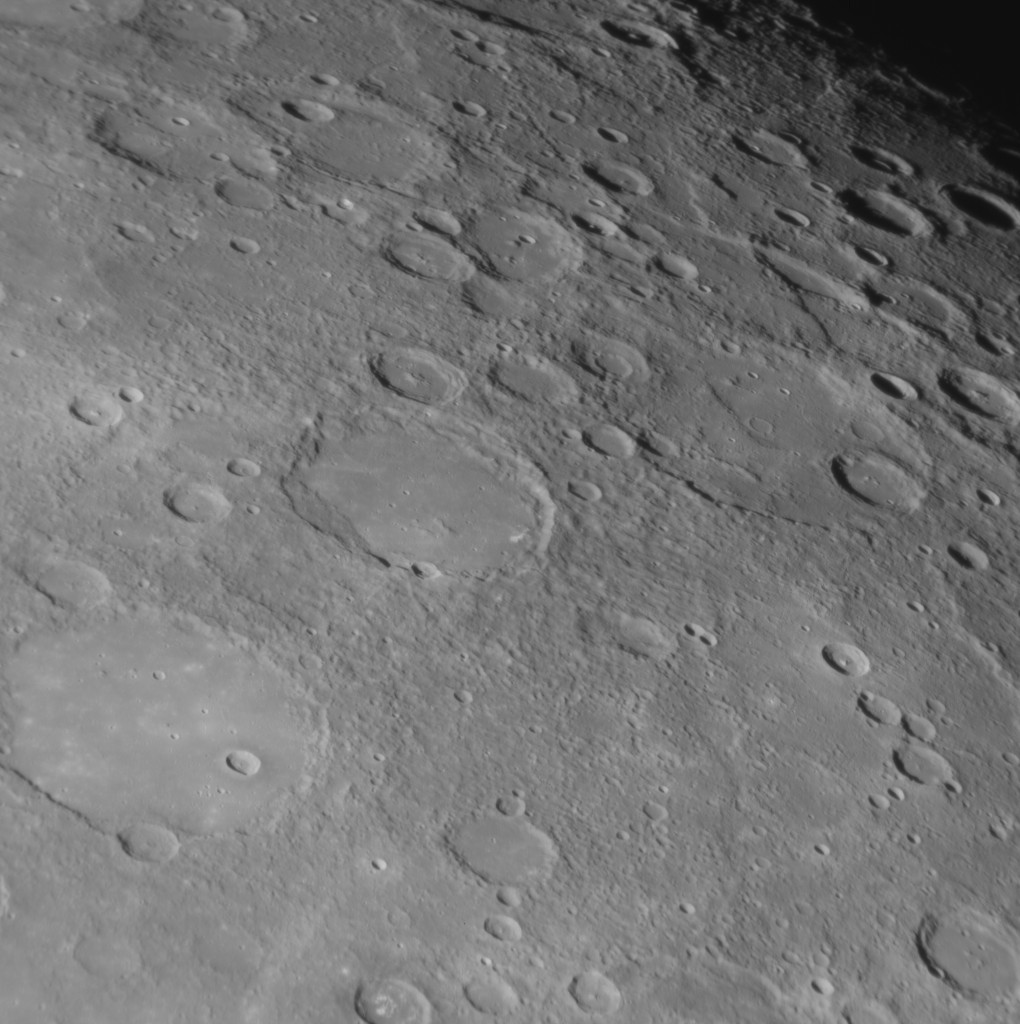
View from MESSENGER's second flyby in October 2008, with Bramante near center

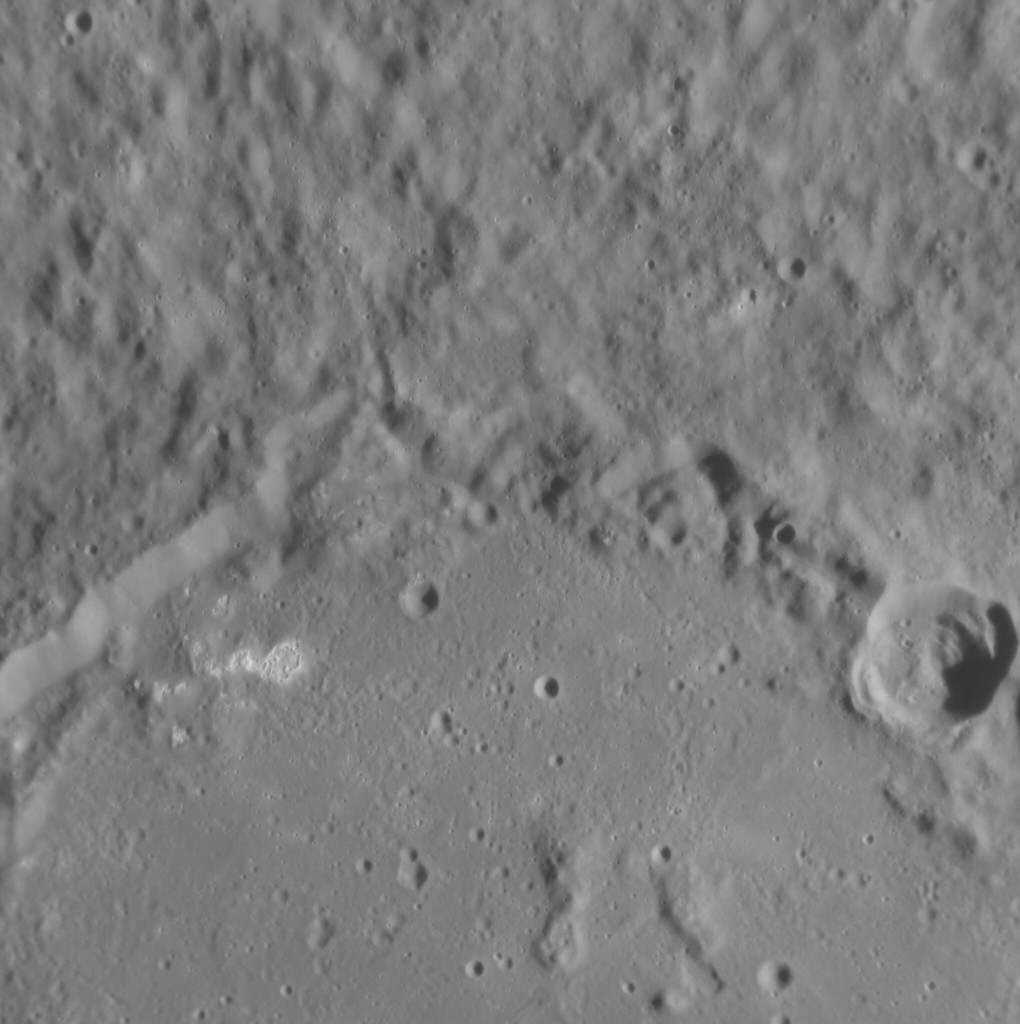
Closeup of northern Bramante with hollows at left
