= Discovery quadrangle =

Quadrangle on Mercury

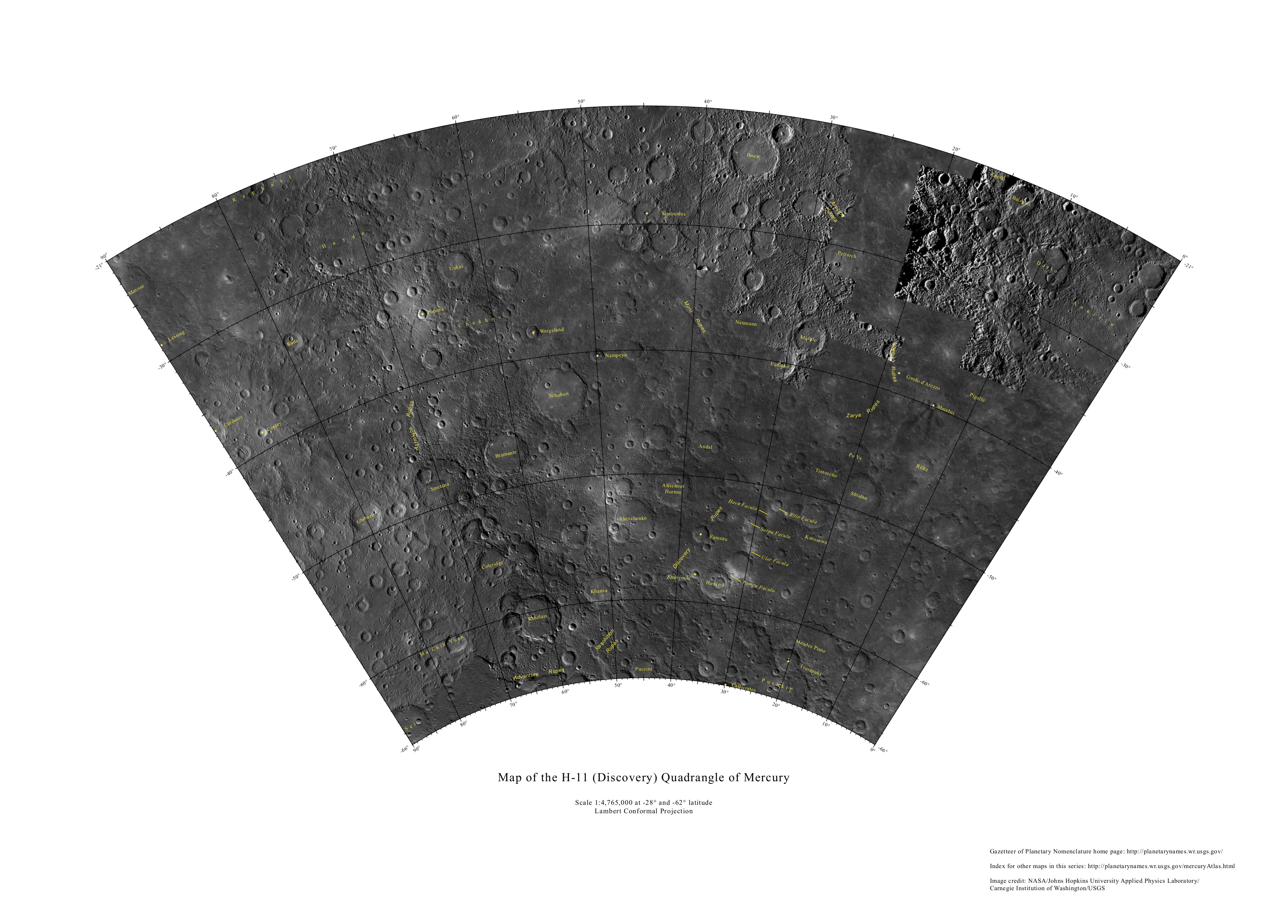
Discovery quadrangle as mapped by the MESSENGER spacecraft (2021)

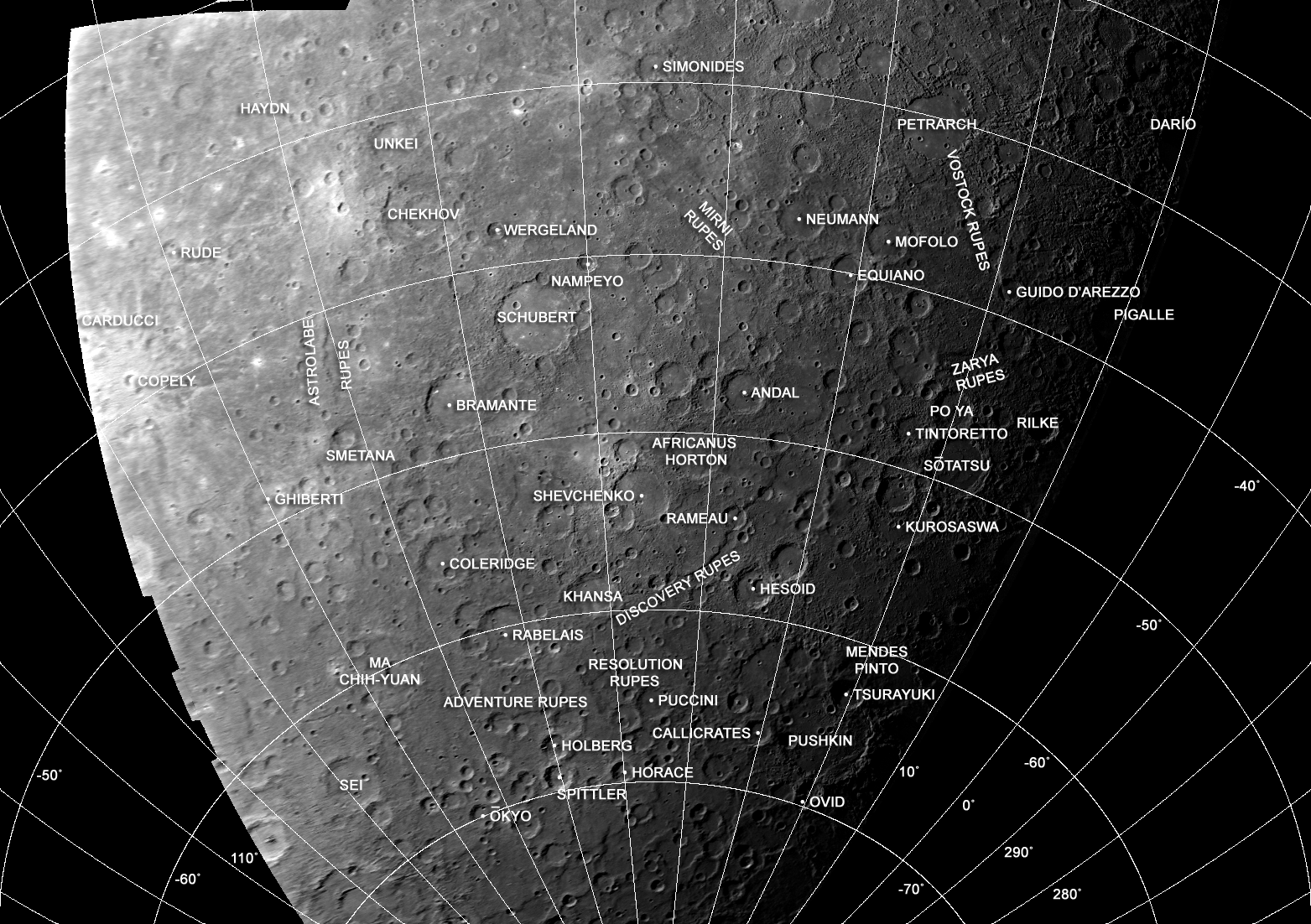
Mariner 10 photomosaic (1975)

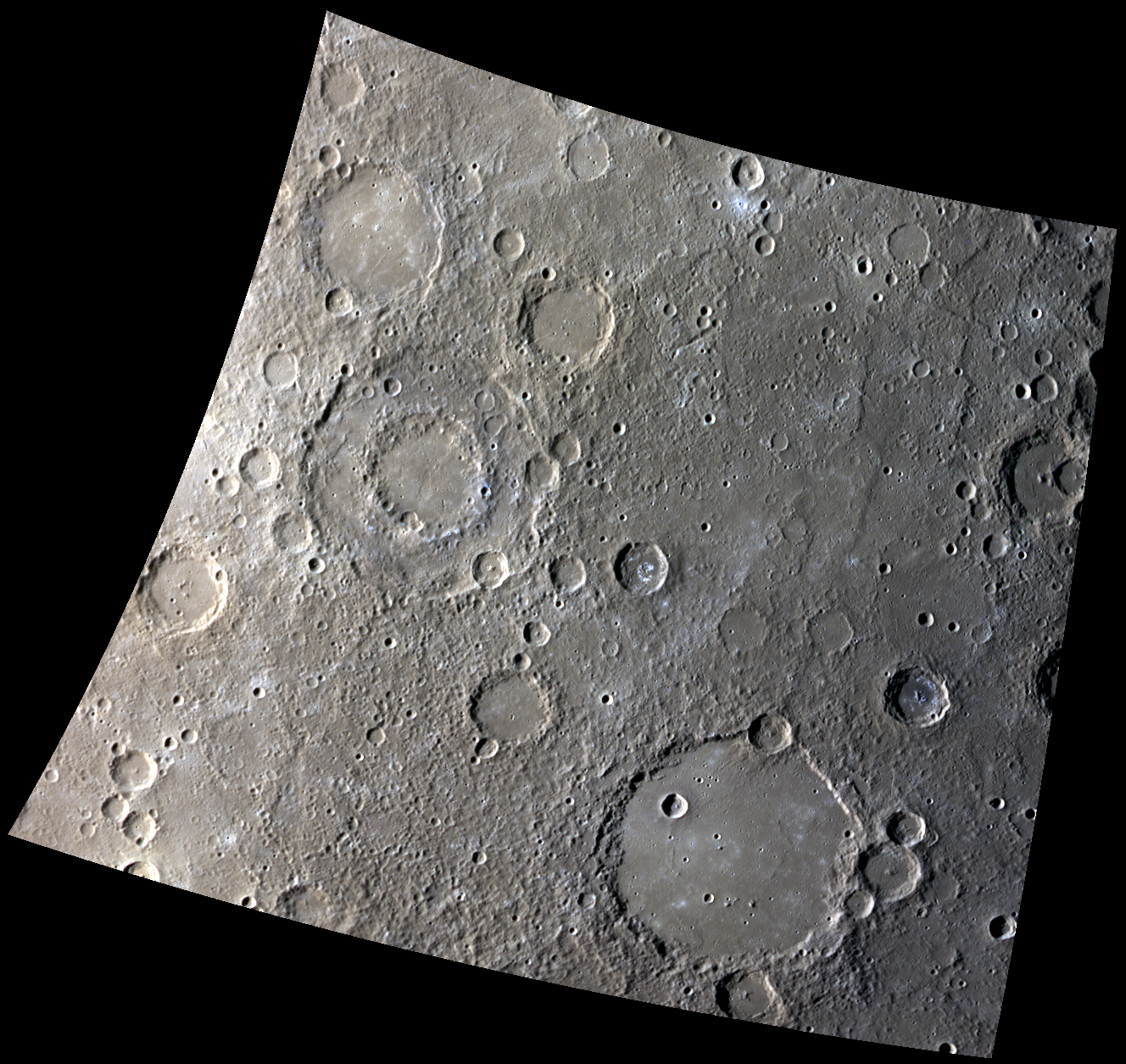
Exaggerated color image of the central part of the quadrangle, showing craters Checkhov, Schubert, Wergeland, and Nampeyo

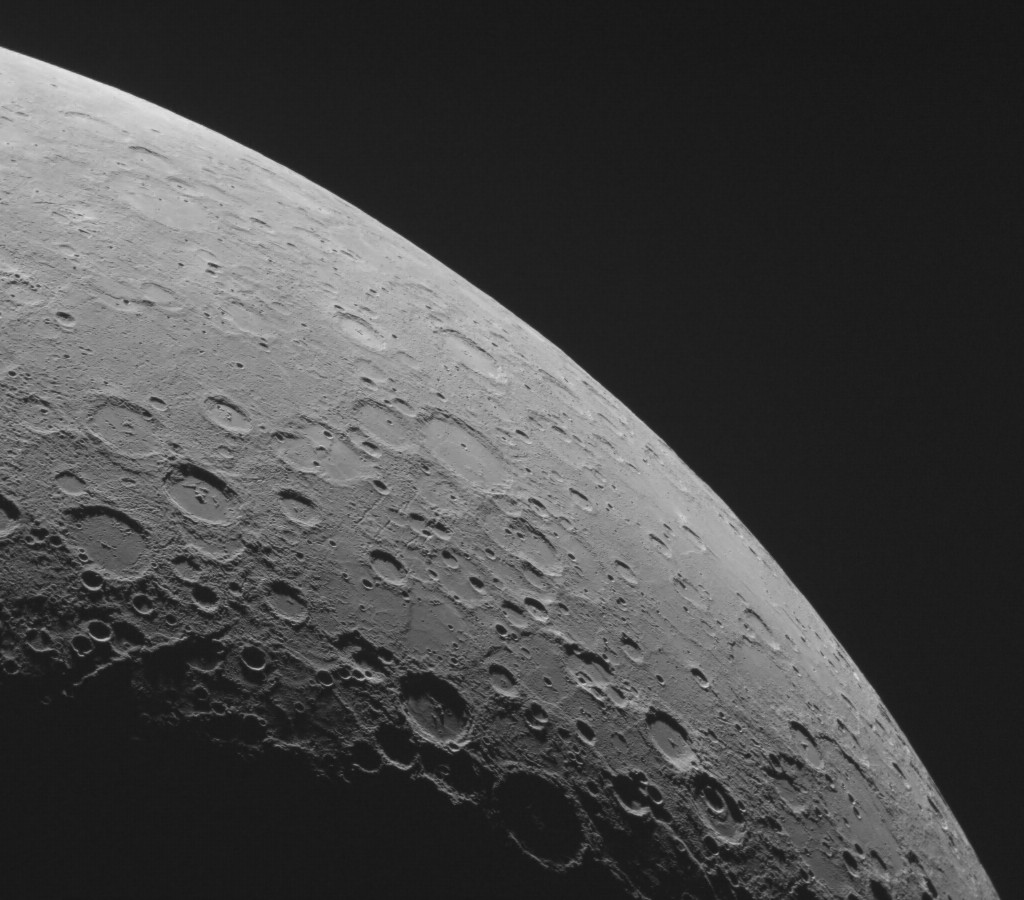
Eastern part of the quadrangle. At center are Sōtatsu, Po Ya, and Tintoretto. At left are Mofolo, Equiano, and Neumann. At right are Mendes Pinto, Tsurayuki, and Pushkin.

The Discovery quadrangle lies within the heavily cratered part of Mercury in a region roughly antipodal to the 1550-km-wide Caloris Basin. Like the rest of the heavily cratered part of the planet, the quadrangle contains a spectrum of craters and basins ranging in size from those at the limit of resolution of the best photographs to those as much as 350 km across, and ranging in degree of freshness from pristine to severely degraded. Interspersed with the craters and basins both in space and time are plains deposits that are probably of several different origins. Because of its small size and very early segregation into core and crust, Mercury has seemingly been a dead planet for a long time—possibly longer than the Moon. Its geologic history, therefore, records with considerable clarity some of the earliest and most violent events that took place in the inner Solar System.

The Bach quadrangle is south of Discovery quadrangle. To the west is Michelangelo quadrangle, and to the east is Debussy quadrangle. To the north is Kuiper quadrangle, and to the northwest is Beethoven quadrangle.

== Stratigraphy ==
=== Crater and basin materials ===
As on the Moon and Mars, sequences of craters and basins of differing relative ages provide the best means of establishing stratigraphic order on Mercury. Overlap relations among many large mercurian craters and basins are clearer than those on the Moon. Therefore, we can build up many local stratigraphic columns involving both crater or basin materials and nearby plains materials.

Over all of Mercury, the crispness of crater rims and the morphology of their walls, central peaks, ejecta deposits, and secondary-crater fields have undergone systematic changes with time. The youngest craters or basins in a local stratigraphic sequence have the sharpest, crispest appearance. The oldest craters consist only of shallow depressions with slightly raised, rounded rims, some incomplete. On this basis, five age categories of craters and basins have been mapped. In addition, secondary crater fields are preserved around proportionally far more craters and basins on Mercury than on the Moon or Mars, and are particularly useful in determining overlap relations and degree of modification.

=== Plains materials ===
All low-lying areas and the areas between craters and basins in the Discovery quadrangle are covered by broadly level, plains-forming material, except for small areas covered by the hilly and lineated material and hummocky plains material described below. Tracts of plains materials range in size from a few kilometers across to intercrater areas several hundred kilometers in width. This material is probably not all of the same origin. Strom and others and Trask and Strom cited evidence that many large areas of plains are of volcanic origin. Smaller tracts are more apt to be impact melt, loose debris pooled in low spots by seismic shaking, or ejecta from secondary impacts. The origin of many individual tracts must necessarily remain uncertain without additional information.

Plains materials have been grouped into four units on the basis of both the density of super-posed craters and the relation of each unit to adjacent crater and basin materials. These units are listed as follows from oldest to youngest.

1. Intercrater plains material is widespread, has a high density of small craters (5 to 15 km in diameter), and appears to predate most of the relatively old and degraded craters and basins, although some tracts of intercrater plains material may be younger than some old craters.
2. Intermediate plains material is less abundant than the intercrater plains unit and has a density of superposed small craters that is intermediate between those of the intercrater plains and smooth plains units. The intermediate plains material is most readily mapped on the floors of those c1, c2, and c3 craters and basins that are surrounded by intercrater plains material with a distinctly higher crater density (FDS 27428). Contacts between intercrater plains and intermediate plains units that occur outside mapped craters and basins are gradational and uncertain. In parts of the quadrangle, photographic resolution and lighting do not permit the intermediate plains unit to be separated from the intercrater plains or smooth plains units with a high level of confidence.
3. Smooth plains material occurs in relatively small patches throughout the quadrangle on the floors of c4 and older craters and basins and in tracts between craters. More bright-halo craters occur on this unit than on either the inter-crater plains or intermediate plains units.
4. Very smooth plains material occurs on the floors of some of the youngest craters. In summary, a complex history of contemporaneous formation of craters, basins, and plains is thus indicated by the mapping.

=== Relief-forming materials ===
The Discovery quadrangle includes some of the most distinctive relief-forming material on the planet, the hilly and lineated terrain unit mapped by Trask and Guest. The unit consists of a jumble of evenly spaced hills and valleys about equal in size. Most craters within this material appear to predate its formation, and their ages cannot be estimated: their rims have been disrupted into hills and valleys identical to those of the hilly and lineated unit; the floors of some of these degraded craters contain hummocky plains material that resembles the hilly and lineated unit, except that the hills are fewer and lower.

The hilly and lineated unit and the enclosed hummocky plains unit appear to be relatively young; they may be the same age as the Caloris Basin. In addition, they lie almost directly opposite that basin on the planet. Both observations strengthen the suggestion that the hilly and lineated unit and the hummocky plains unit are directly related to the formation of Caloris, possibly through the focusing of seismic waves at the antipodal point.

== Structure ==
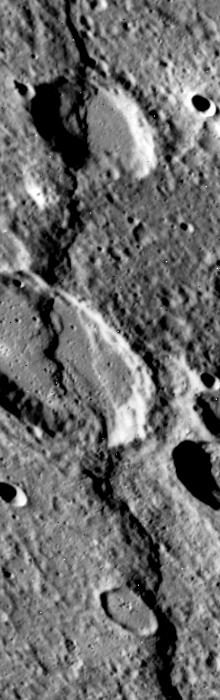
Discovery Rupes cuts through Rameau crater, center

Morphologically diverse scarps, ridges, troughs, and other structural lineaments are relatively common in the Discovery quadrangle. Dzurisin documented a well-developed pattern of linear lithospheric fractures in the quadrangle that predate the period of heavy bombardment. A dominant structural trend is recognized at N. 50° –45° W., and subsidiary trends occur at N. 50° –70° E. and roughly due north. Joint-controlled mass movements were most likely responsible for the fact that many craters of all ages have polygonal outlines, and some linear joints may have provided surface access for lavas that formed the intercrater plains. Evidence of the latter may be recorded by several linear ridges that may have been formed by lava accretion along linear volcanic vents (for example, Mirni Rupes at latitude 37° S., longitude 40° W., FDS 27420).

Planimetrically arcuate escarpments in the Discovery quadrangle cut intercrater plains and crater materials as young as c4. These scarps are typically 100 to 400 km long and 0.5 to 1.0 km high, and they have convex-upward slopes in cross section that steepen from brink to base. More trend closer to north–south than to east–west. Discovery (lat 55° S., long 38° W.), Vostok (lat 38° S., long 20° W.), Adventure (lat 64° S., long 63° W.), and Resolution (lat 63° S., long 52° W.) Rupes are the most prominent examples in the quadrangle. Vostok transects and foreshortens the crater Guido d'Arezzo, which suggests that arcuate scarps are compressional tectonic features (thrust or high-angle reverse faults). Melosh and Dzurisin have speculated that both arcuate scarps and the global mercurian lineament pattern may have formed as a result of simultaneous despinning and thermal contraction of Mercury.

Planimetrically irregular scarps on the floors of many plains-filled craters and basins are the youngest recognized structural features in the quadrangle, as they cut both the smooth plains and intermediate plains materials. Their occurrence inside only smooth-floored craters and basins suggests that the stresses responsible for their formation were local in extent, perhaps induced by magma intrusion or withdrawal beneath volcanically flooded craters.

== Geologic history ==
Any reconstruction of mercurian geologic history must include the inference that at an early time the planet was differentiated into a core and crust. Mercury has a weak magnetic field coupled with high density. Both facts can most easily be accounted for by the presence of an iron core, possibly liquid, roughly 4,200 km in diameter, overlain by a silicate crust a few hundred kilometers thick. The postulated volcanic origin of a substantial fraction of the Mercurian plains also implies a thick silicate crust, and thereby supports the existence of a large iron core.

Early, rather than late, differentiation of Mercury is attested to by the compressional scarps that are so clearly seen in the Discovery quadrangle. Segregation of the core must have released large amounts of heat, which would have resulted in significant expansion of the crust. However, unambiguous extensional features (very rare on the planet as a whole) are not seen in the Discovery quadrangle; only compressional scarps occur. Thus, core segregation occurred relatively early (before formation of a solid lithosphere) and was followed by cooling and contraction, the last phases of which probably contributed to the formation of arcuate scarps that predated the end of heavy bombardment.

Rotational breaking by solar torques is another process likely to have occurred early in Mercurian history. With the formation of a solid lithosphere, stresses induced by tidal despinning most likely were sufficient to cause widespread fracturing. Melosh has shown analytically that the expected pattern of fracturing includes linear strike-slip faults oriented roughly N. 60° W. and N. 60° E., and a younger set of thrust faults with east–west throw and rough north–south trends. Melosh and Dzurisin have pointed out the similarity between this predicted tectonic pattern and that observed on Mercury, and they have proposed that the global system of lineaments and arcuate scarps, which is well developed in the Discovery quadrangle, formed in response to early, simultaneous planetary contraction and tidal despinning.

The observable stratigraphic record in the Discovery quadrangle starts with formation of the intercrater plains, parts of which may have been coeval with the oldest observable craters. During this period, rates of volcanism were probably high as heat from core formation was being dissipated. If the crust was in a state of extension, there would have been easy pathways for large volumes of magma to reach the surface. The resulting plasticity of the crust probably caused large numbers of c1 and c2 craters to be destroyed by isostatic adjustment, so the present inventory of c1 and c2 craters may not be complete.

By c3 time, the rate of volcanism had declined although the impact rate was still high. The preservation of many secondaries1 to 5 km across around c3 basins indicates that surface flows that would have obliterated them were highly restricted. However, some degradation of c3 basins occurred by isostatic adjustment. Most of the intermediate plains material formed at this time. Smooth plains material appears to be largely coeval with c4 craters and basins. The crust was under compression during c3 and c4 time, inasmuch as the compressional scarps and ridges post-date some c3 and c4 craters, and are cut by some c4 craters and by c5 craters. Formation of intermediate and smooth plains materials may have been abetted by the c3 and c4 crater- and basin-forming events that opened up temporary magma conduits. One of the latest large impacts was the Caloris event, which occurred on the other side of the planet from the Discovery quadrangle and which may have initiated formation of the hilly and lineated material within it.

Subsequent to formation of the smooth plains material, the Discovery quadrangle underwent minor tectonic adjustments that formed scarps on plains within craters. The very smooth plains unit was formed in some young craters. The only other activity was a steady rain of relatively small impacts, apparently at about the same rate as on the Moon.

H-1 Borealis (features)
H-5 Hokusai (features)	H-4 Raditladi (features)	H-3 Shakespeare (features)		H-2 Victoria (features)
H-10 Derain (features)	H-9 Eminescu (features)	H-8 Tolstoj (features)	H-7 Beethoven (features)	H-6 Kuiper (features)
H-14 Debussy (features)	H-13 Neruda (features)	H-12 Michelangelo (features)		H-11 Discovery (features)
H-15 Bach (features)
