= Rimbaud (crater) =

Crater on Mercury

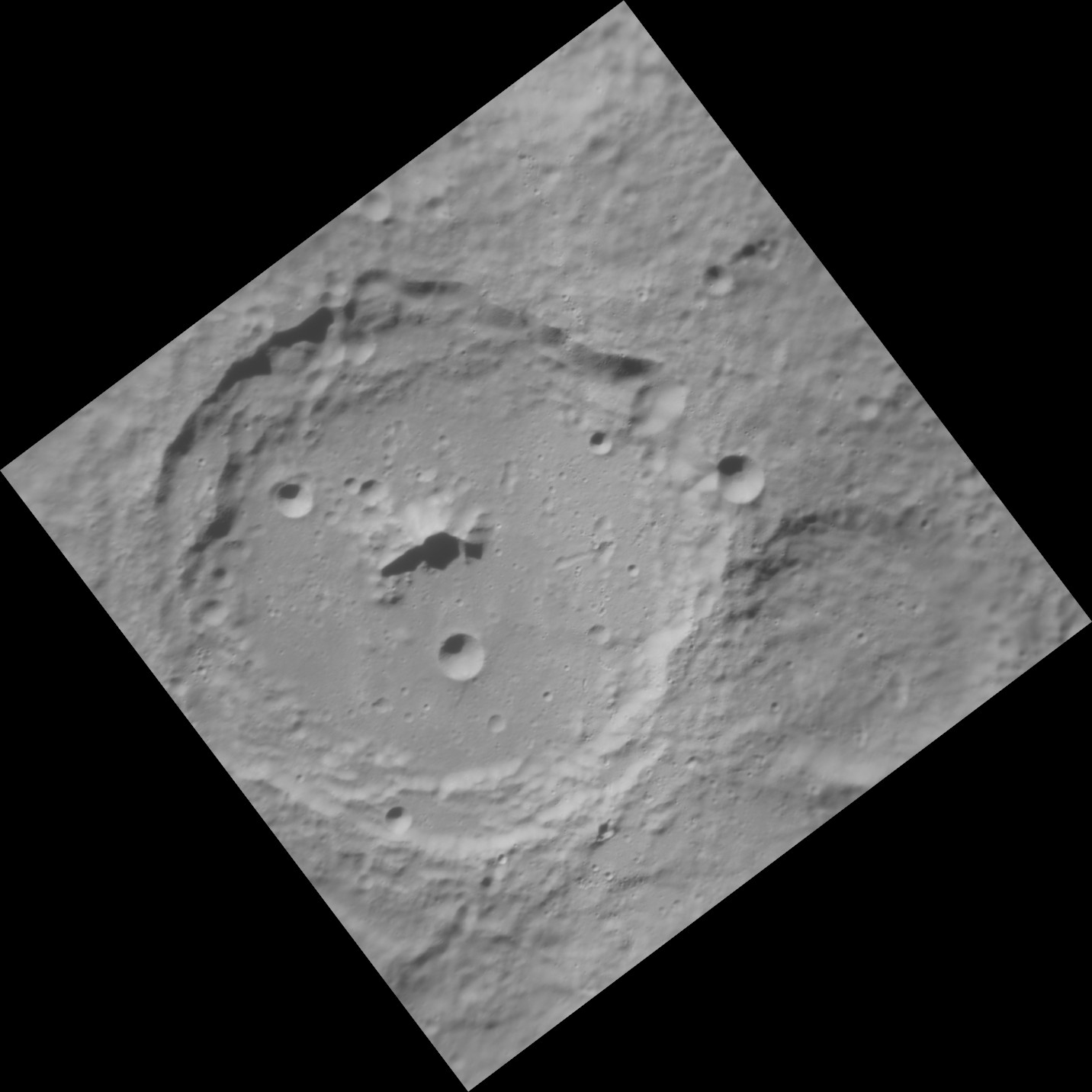
- MESSENGER NAC
- Planet: Mercury
- Coordinates: 63.62°S 148.90°W
- Quadrangle: Michelangelo
- Diameter: 78 km (48 mi)
- Eponym: Arthur Rimbaud

Rimbaud is a crater on Mercury. Its name was adopted by the International Astronomical Union (IAU) in 1985. Rimbaud is named for French poet Arthur Rimbaud. The crater was first imaged by Mariner 10 in 1974.

To the north of Rimbaud is the crater Vincente. To the south are the craters Keats, Dickens, and Han Kan. One of the rays of Han Kan crosses Rimbaud.
