= Callicrates (disambiguation) =

Callicrates (fl. mid-5th century BC) was an ancient Greek architect.

Callicrates, or Kallikrates, may also refer to:

- Kallikratis, a Cretan village
- Callicrates of Sparta, a Spartan soldier
- Callicrates of Samos, a Ptolemiac naval commander
- Kallikrates, a character in the novel She: A History of Adventure
- Callicrates (crater), a crater on Mercury
- Kallikratis reform, an administrative plan in Greece
