= Sibelius (crater) =

Crater on Mercury

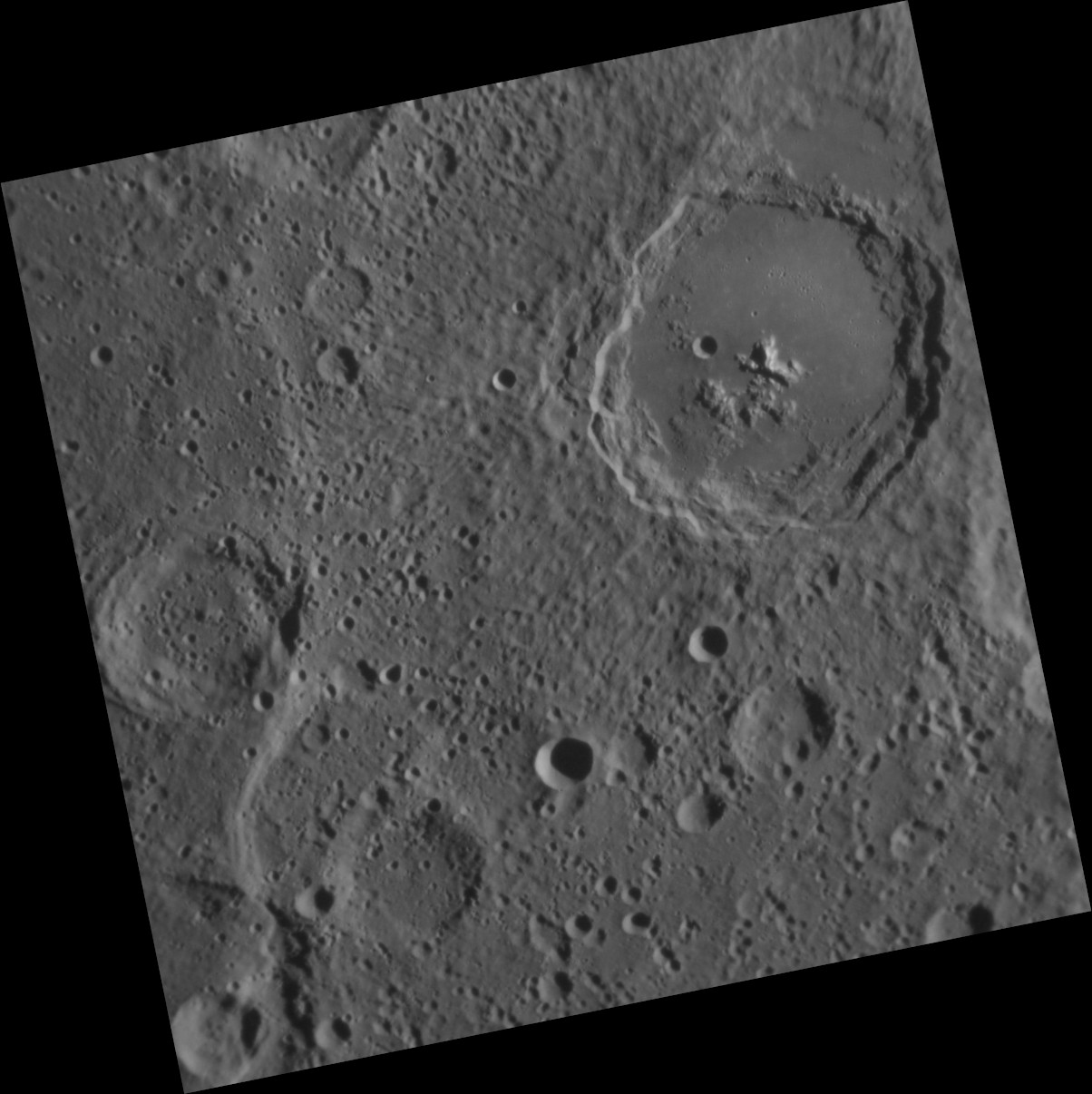
- MESSENGER NAC
- Planet: Mercury
- Coordinates: 49.5°S 145.37°W
- Quadrangle: Michelangelo
- Diameter: 94 km (58 mi)
- Eponym: Jean Sibelius

Sibelius is a crater on Mercury. It has a diameter of 94 kilometres (58 miles). Its name was adopted by the International Astronomical Union (IAU) in 1985. Sibelius is named for the Finnish composer Jean Sibelius. The crater was first imaged by Mariner 10 in 1974.

Sibelius has a complex central peak that is offset from the center to the southwest. Within the central peak complex is a dark spot of low reflectance material (LRM), closely associated with hollows.

To the south of Sibelius is the crater Vincente, and to the east are Delacroix and Shelley. To the northwest is We’wha crater.

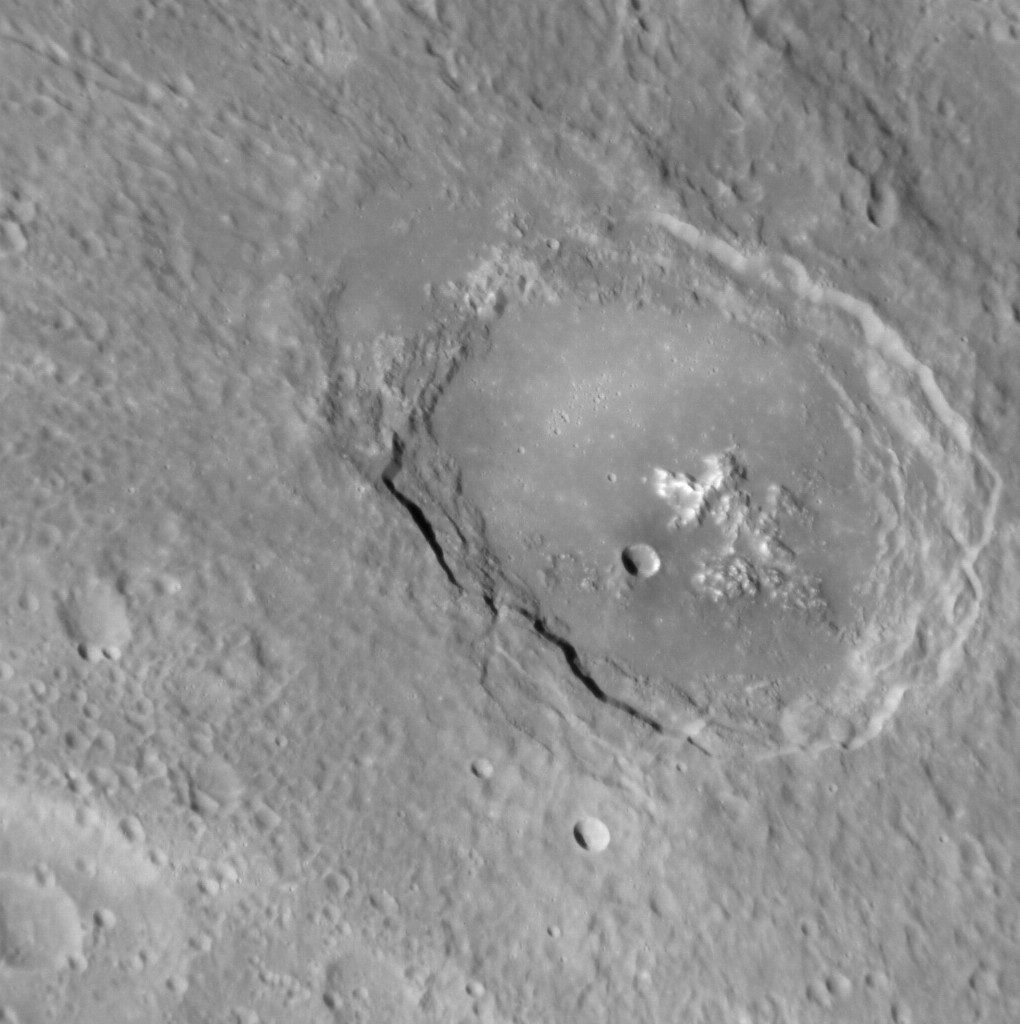
Highest resolution view obtained by MESSENGER

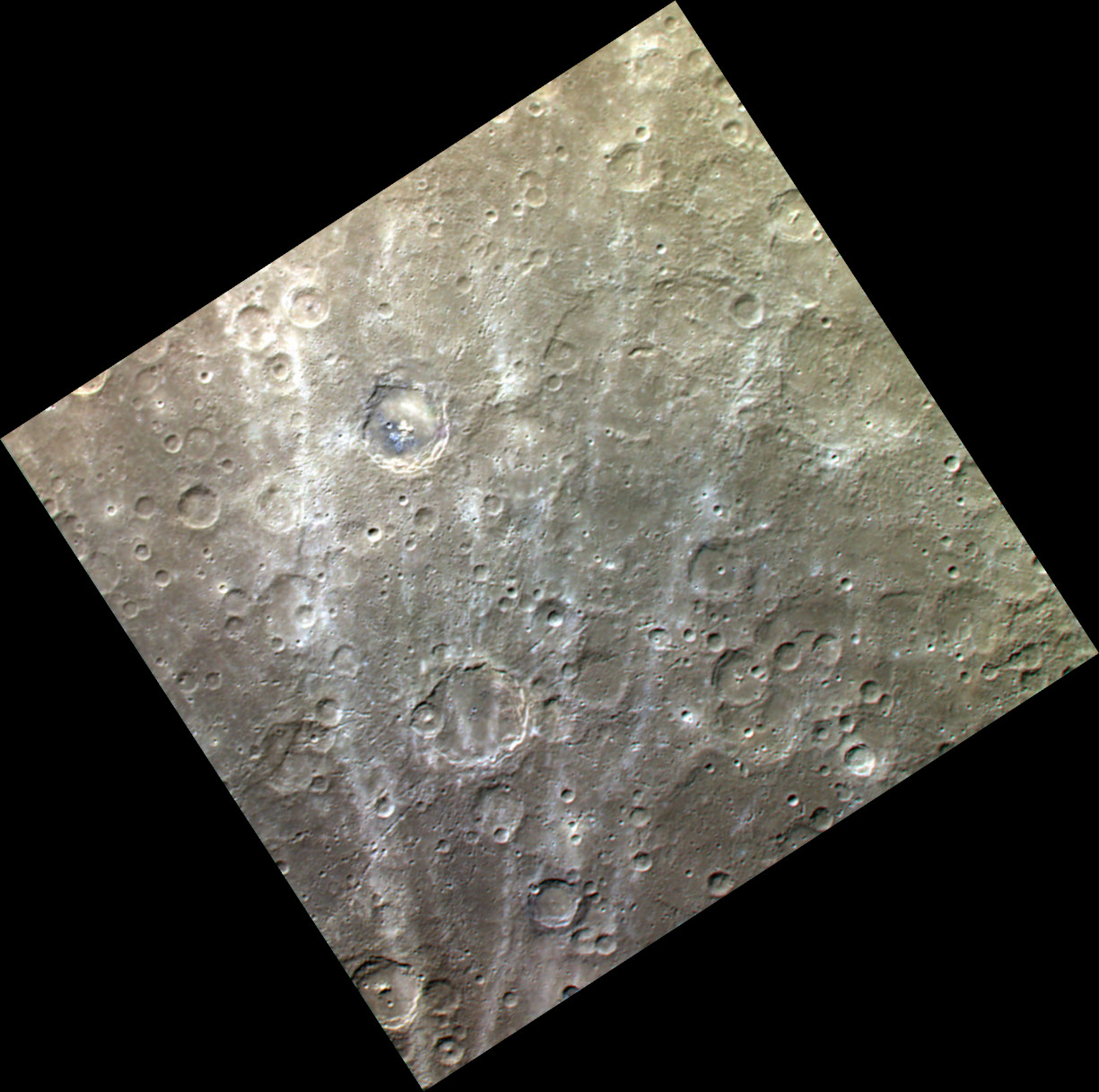
The region around Sibelius in exaggerated color. The rays of Han Kan crater cross the scene.
