= Kobro (crater) =

Crater on Mercury

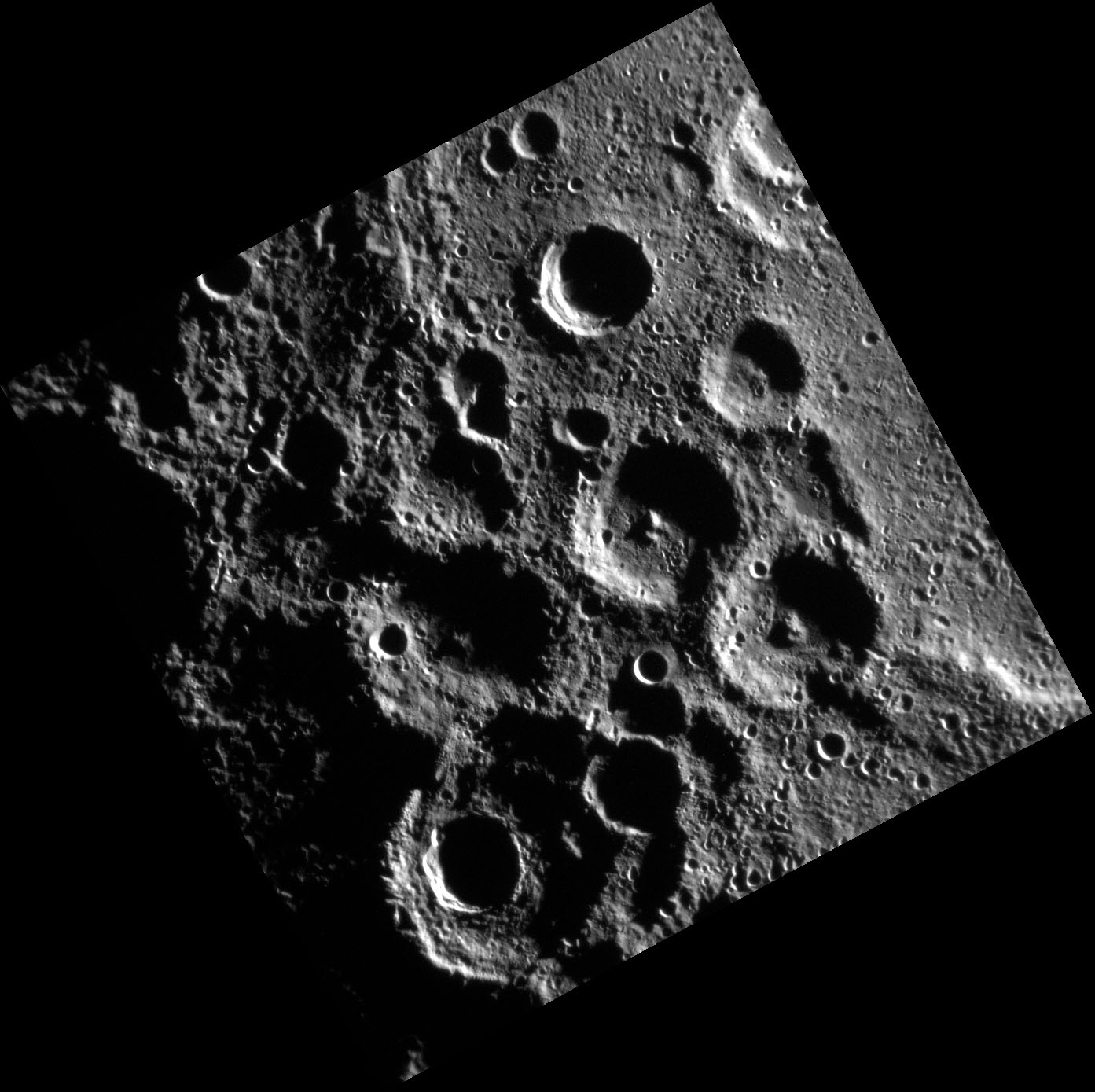
- Kobro crater is located near the center of this image
- Planet: Mercury
- Coordinates: 82.16°S 81.22°E
- Quadrangle: Bach
- Diameter: 54 km (34 mi)
- Eponym: Katarzyna Kobro

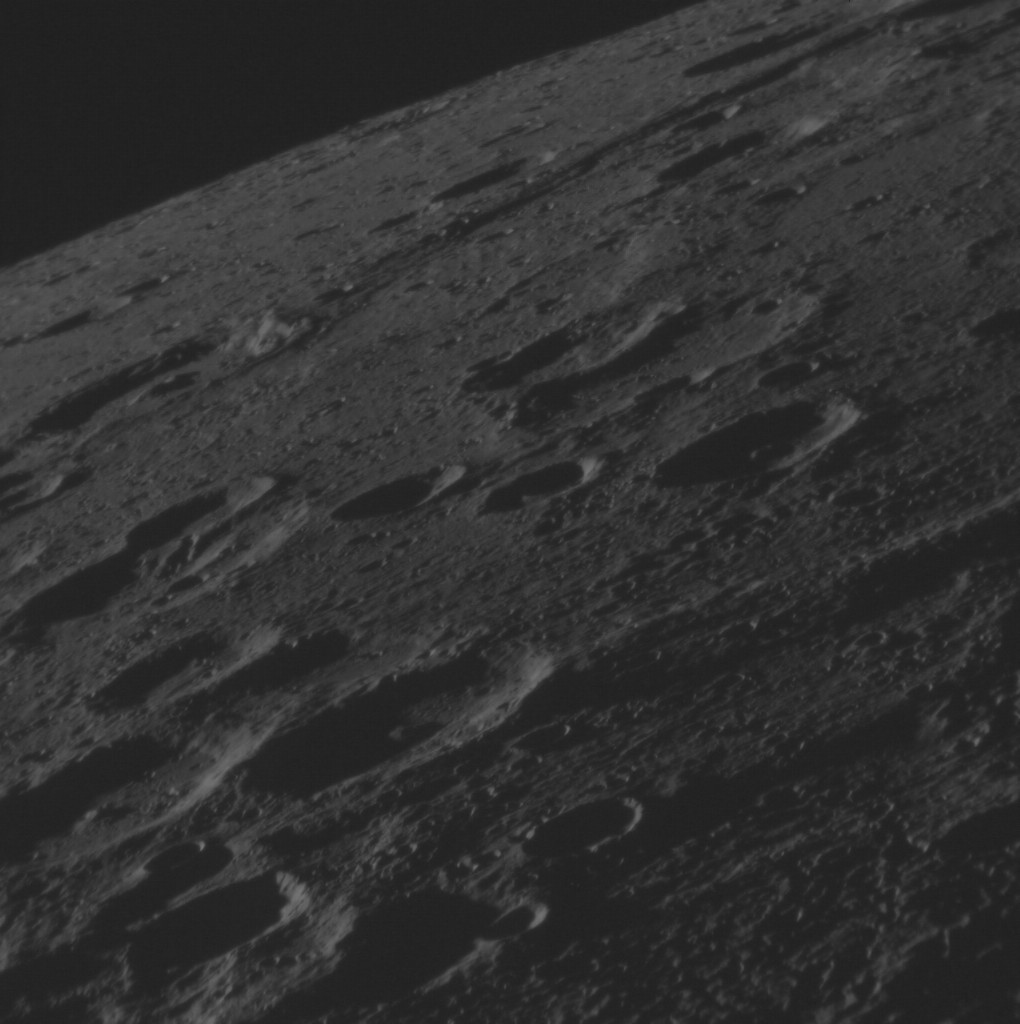
Oblique view looking north with Kobro and Komeda craters in left foreground

Kobro is a crater near the south pole of the planet Mercury. Its name was adopted by the International Astronomical Union (IAU) on the December 12, 2012. Kobro is named for the Polish sculptor Katarzyna Kobro. It is adjacent to Komeda crater, which was named at the same time.

The northern floor of Kobro is in permanent shadow.
