= Keats (crater) =

Crater on Mercury

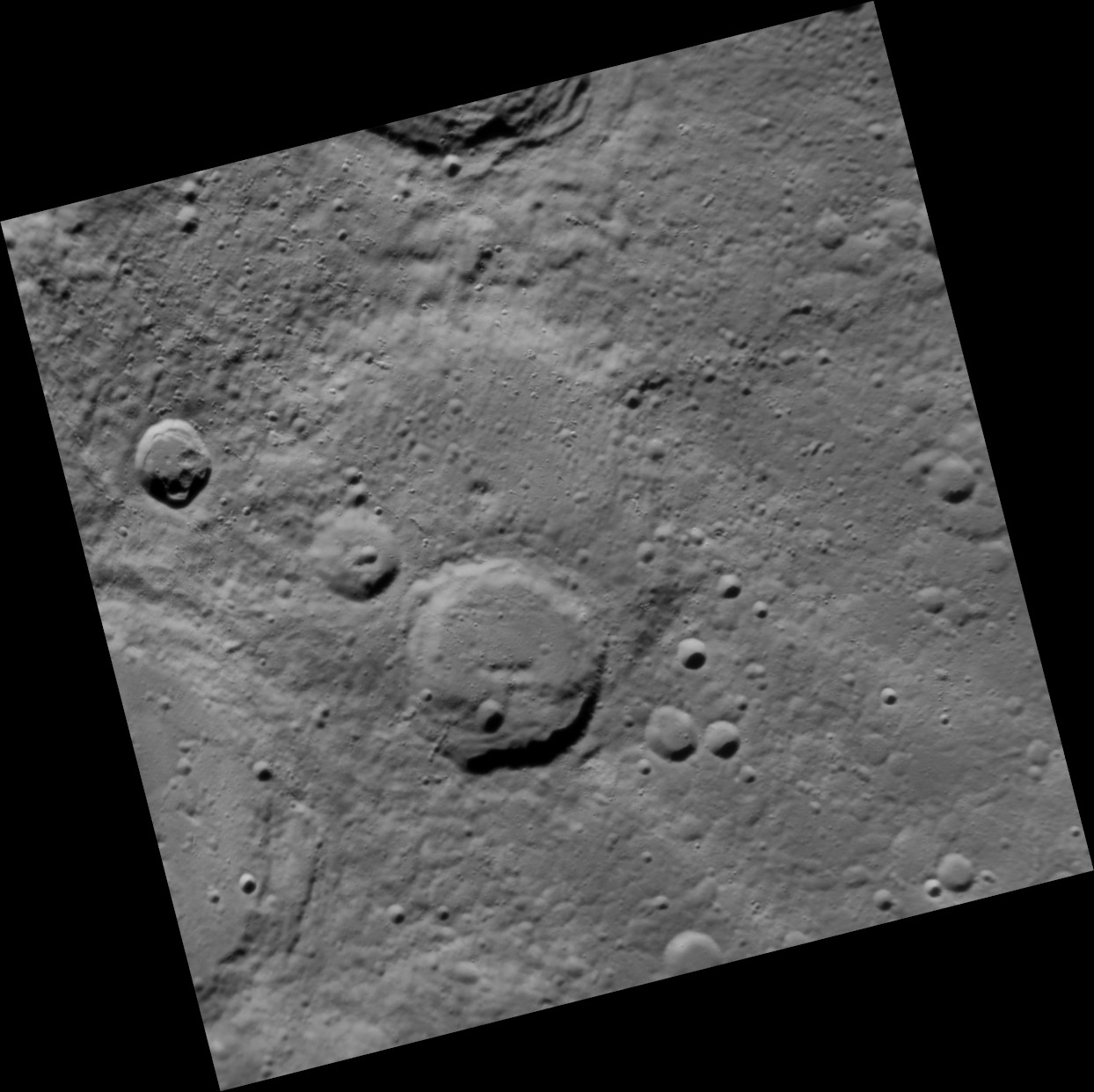
- MESSENGER NAC of Keats
- Feature type: Impact crater
- Location: Bach quadrangle, Mercury
- Coordinates: 70.31°S 156.65°W
- Diameter: 107.85 km (67.01 mi)
- Eponym: John Keats

Keats is a crater on Mercury. The crater's name was adopted by the International Astronomical Union (IAU) in 1976 and named after an English poet. This poet is known as John Keats, who lived from 1795 to 1821. The crater was first imaged by Mariner 10 in 1974.

The rays of nearby Han Kan crater overlie Keats. The crater Dickens is south of Keats.

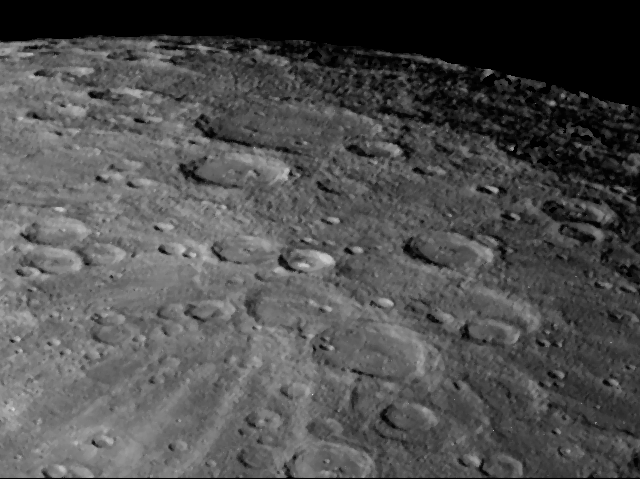
Mariner 10 image with Keats below right of center

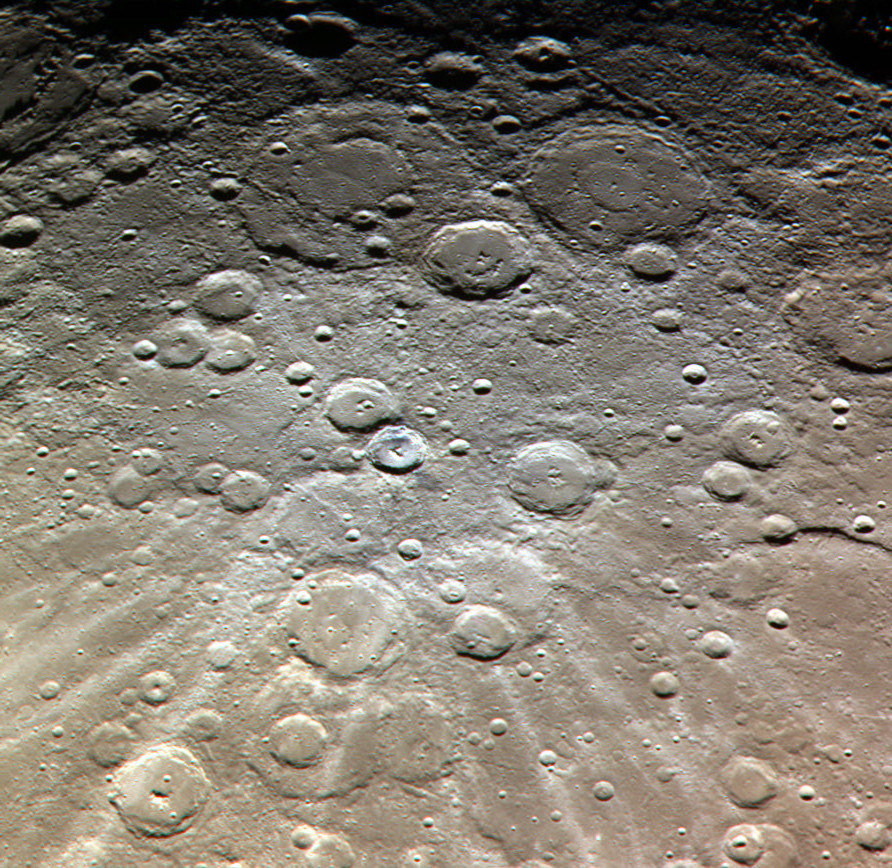
Exaggerated color image by MESSENGER with Keats near center
