= Vincente (crater) =

Crater on Mercury

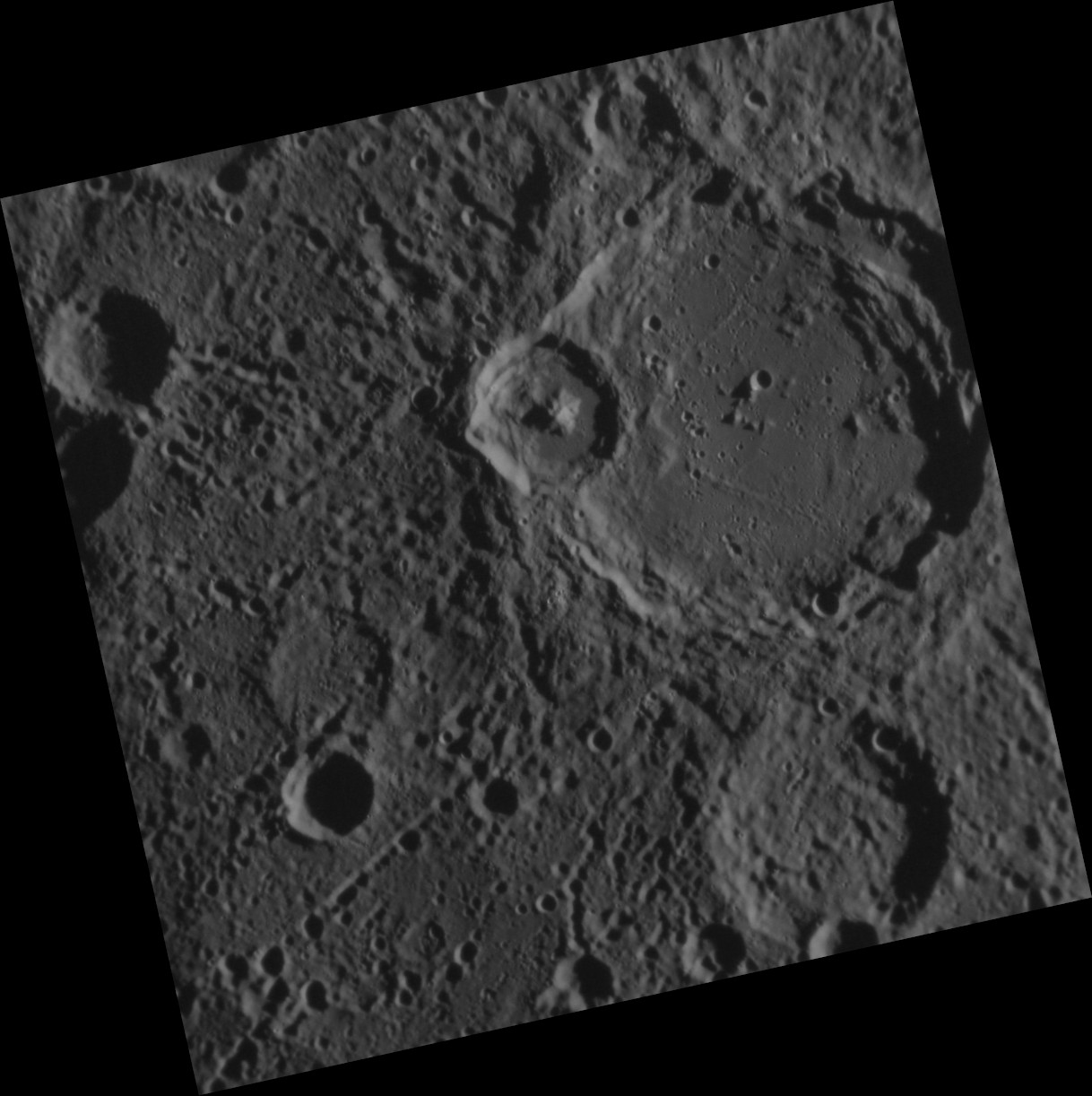
- MESSENGER NAC
- Planet: Mercury
- Coordinates: 56.75°S 142.96°W
- Quadrangle: Michelangelo
- Diameter: 108 km (67 mi)
- Eponym: Gil Vicente

Vicente is a crater on Mercury. It has a diameter of 108 kilometres (67 miles). Its name was adopted by the International Astronomical Union (IAU) in 1979. Vicente is named for the Portuguese writer Gil Vicente. The crater was first imaged by Mariner 10 in 1974.

To the north of Vincente is the crater Sibelius, and to the south is Rimbaud.

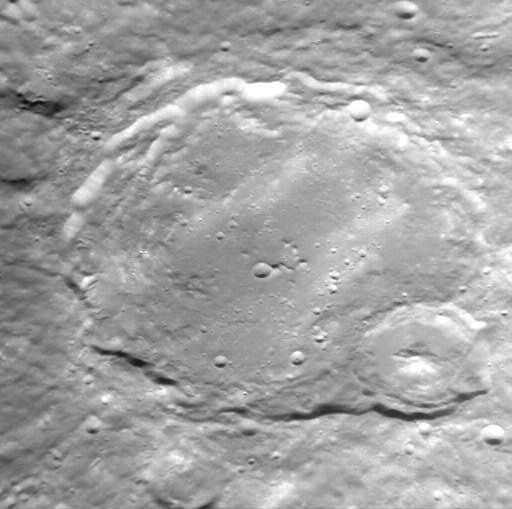
Oblique view of Vincente crater

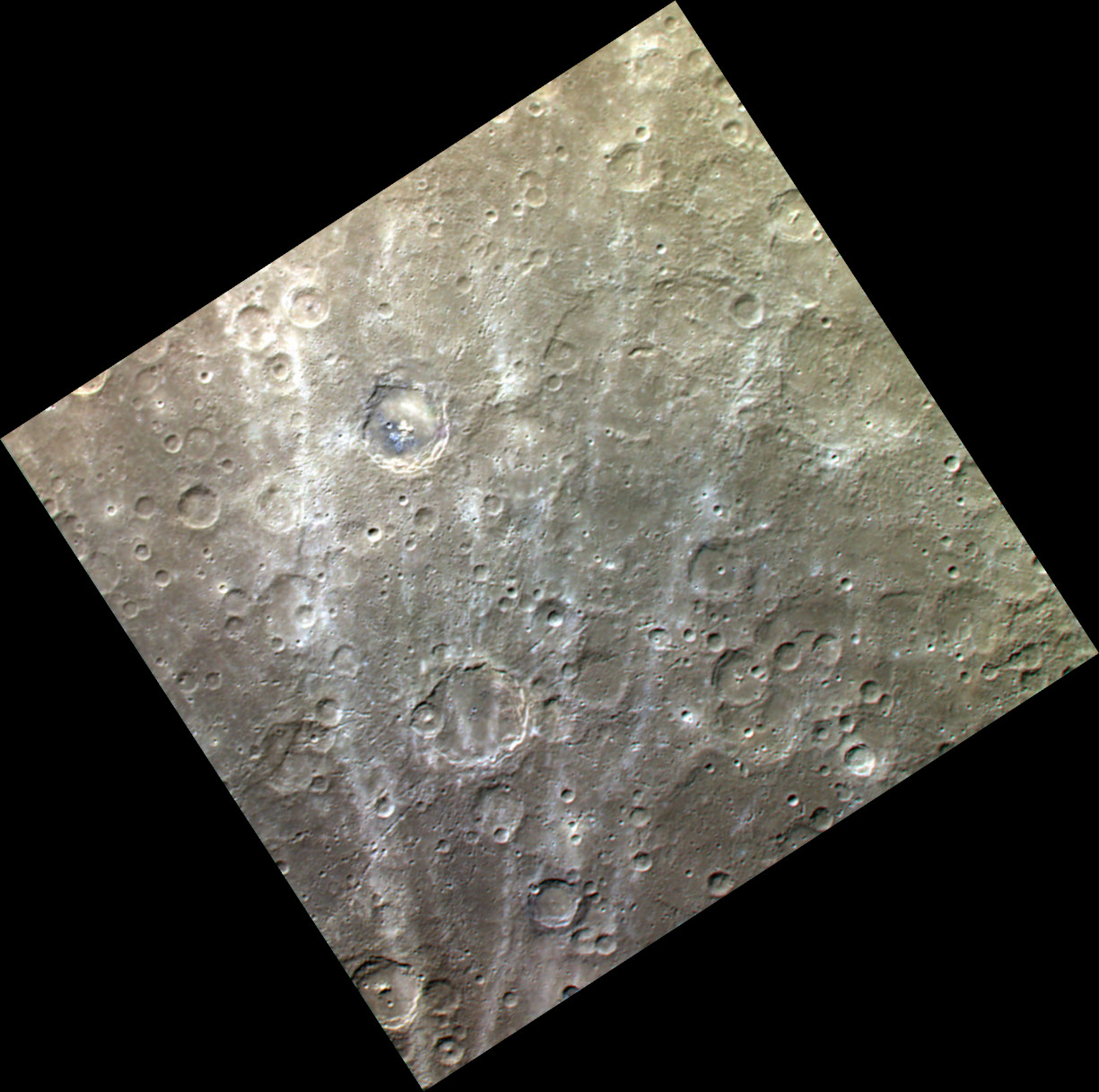
The region around Vincente in exaggerated color. The rays of Han Kan crater cross the scene.
