= Van Gogh (crater) =

Crater on Mercury

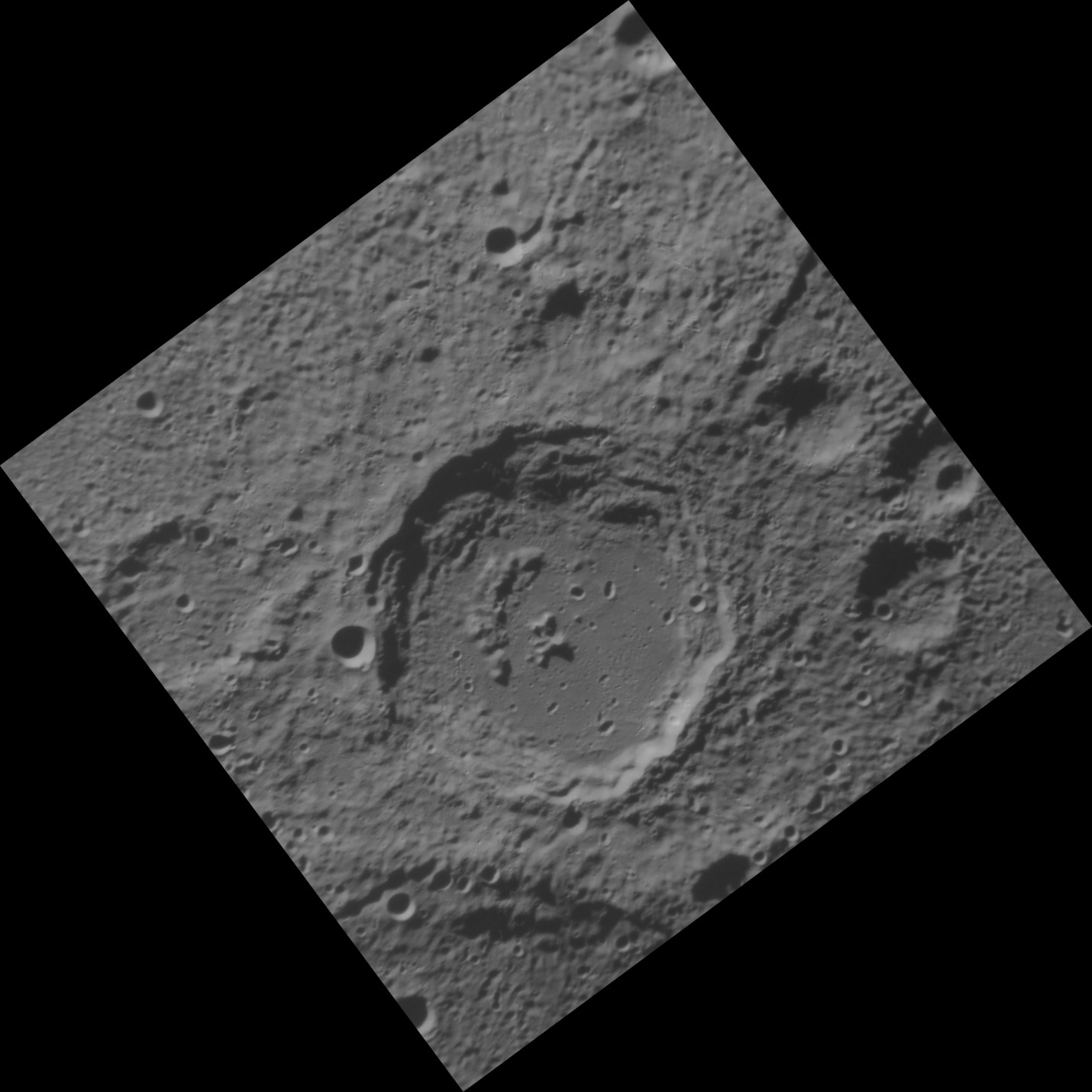
- MESSENGER NAC
- Planet: Mercury
- Coordinates: 76.88°S 138.68°W
- Quadrangle: Bach
- Diameter: 99 km (62 mi)
- Eponym: Vincent van Gogh

Van Gogh is a crater on Mercury. Its name was adopted by the International Astronomical Union (IAU) in 1976. Van Gogh is named for the Dutch painter Vincent van Gogh.

To the south of Van Gogh is Bernini crater, and to the east is Cervantes.

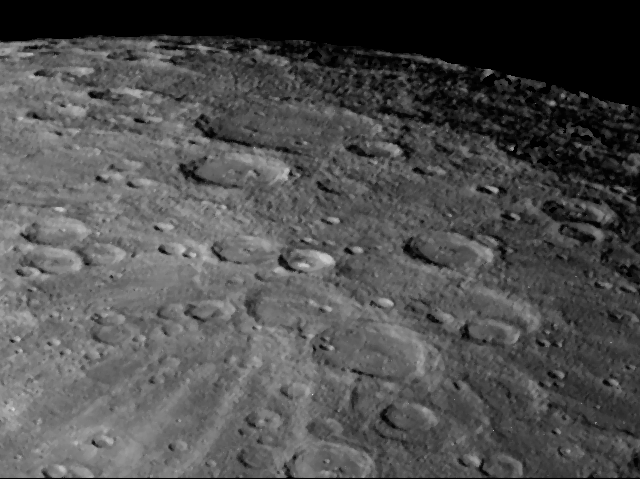
Mariner 10 image with Van Gogh above center

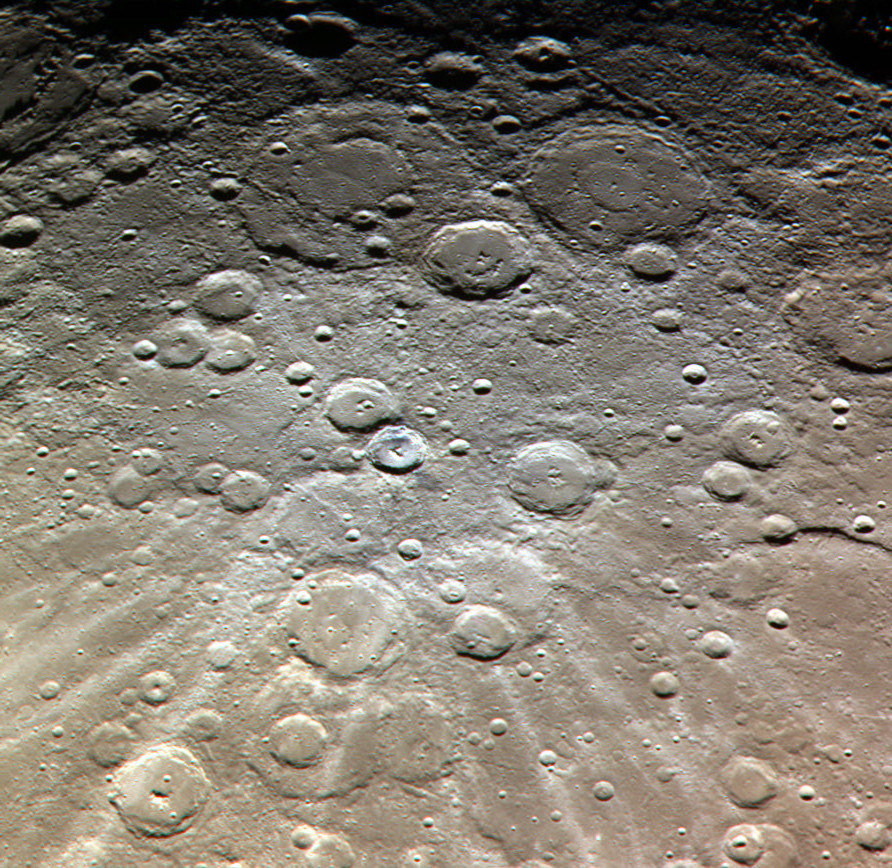
Exaggerated color image by MESSENGER with Van Gogh above center

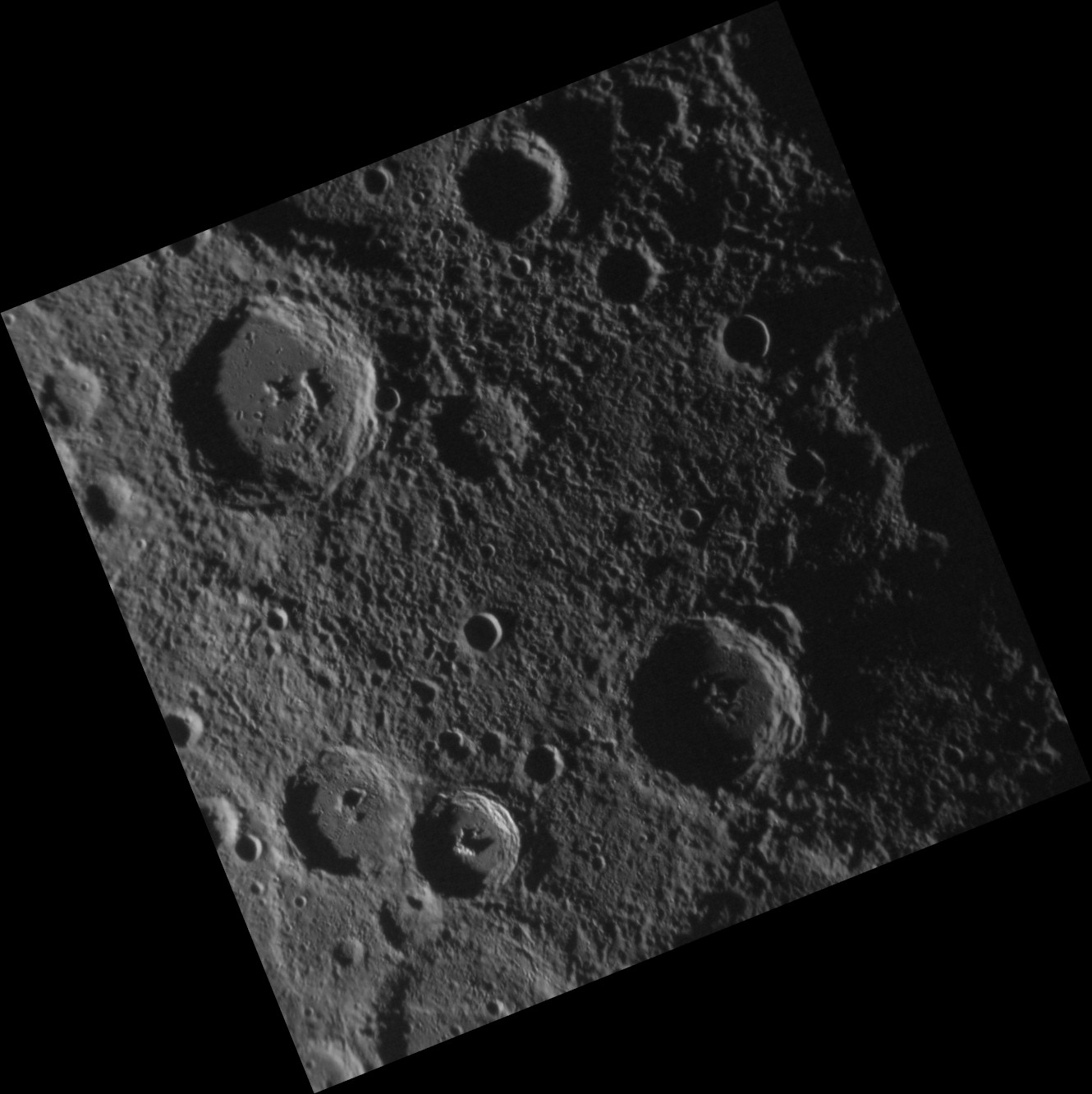
Han Kan (bottom center), Van Gogh (upper left), and Dickens (right) craters
