= Komeda (crater) =

Crater on Mercury

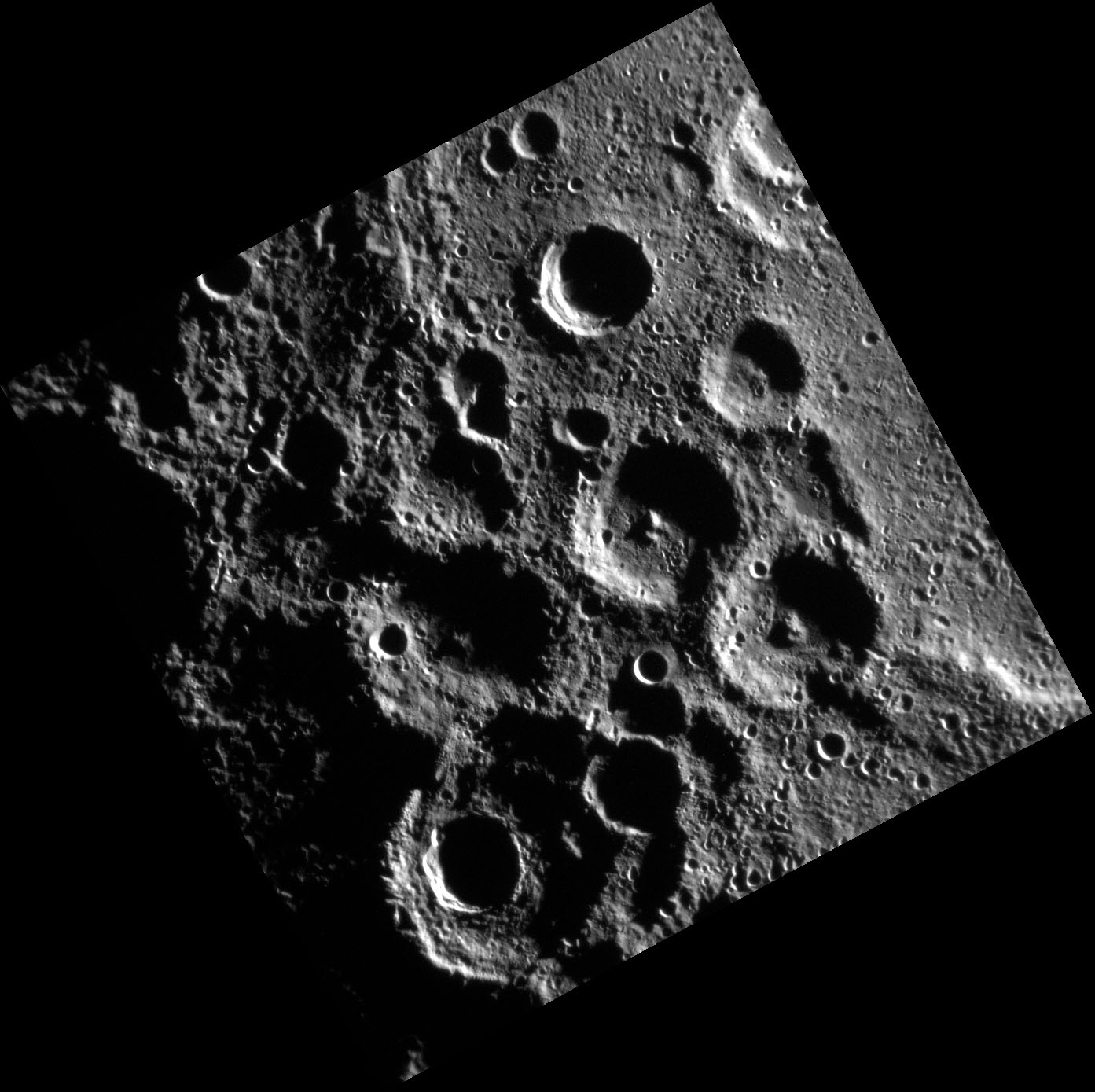
- Komeda crater is located near right corner of image
- Planet: Mercury
- Coordinates: 82.74°S 90.47°E
- Quadrangle: Bach
- Diameter: 54 km (34 mi)
- Eponym: Krzysztof Komeda

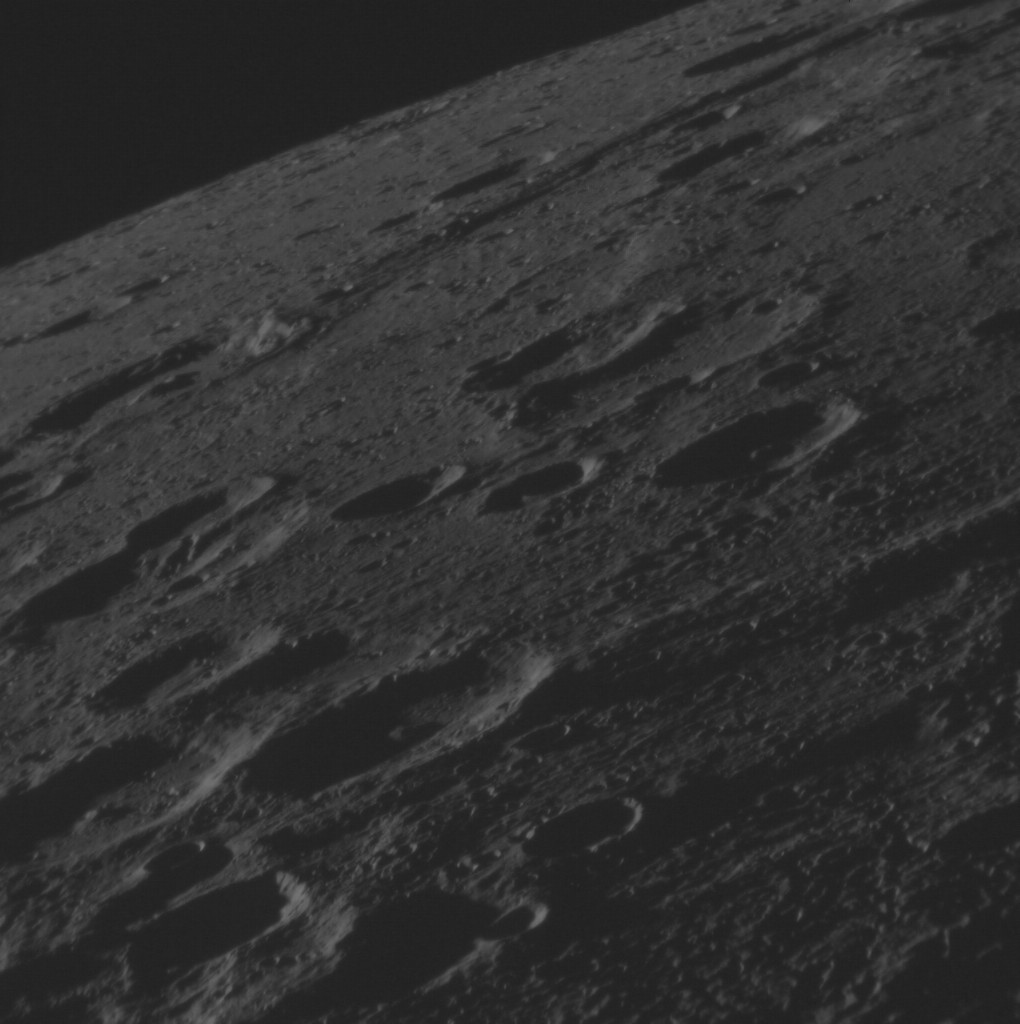
Oblique view looking north with Kobro and Komeda craters in left foreground

Komeda is a crater near the south pole of the planet Mercury. Its name was adopted by the International Astronomical Union (IAU) on the December 19, 2012. Komeda is named for the Polish composer Krzysztof Komeda. It is adjacent to Kobro crater, which was named at the same time.

The northern floor of Komeda is in permanent shadow.
