= Dickens (crater) =

Crater on Mercury

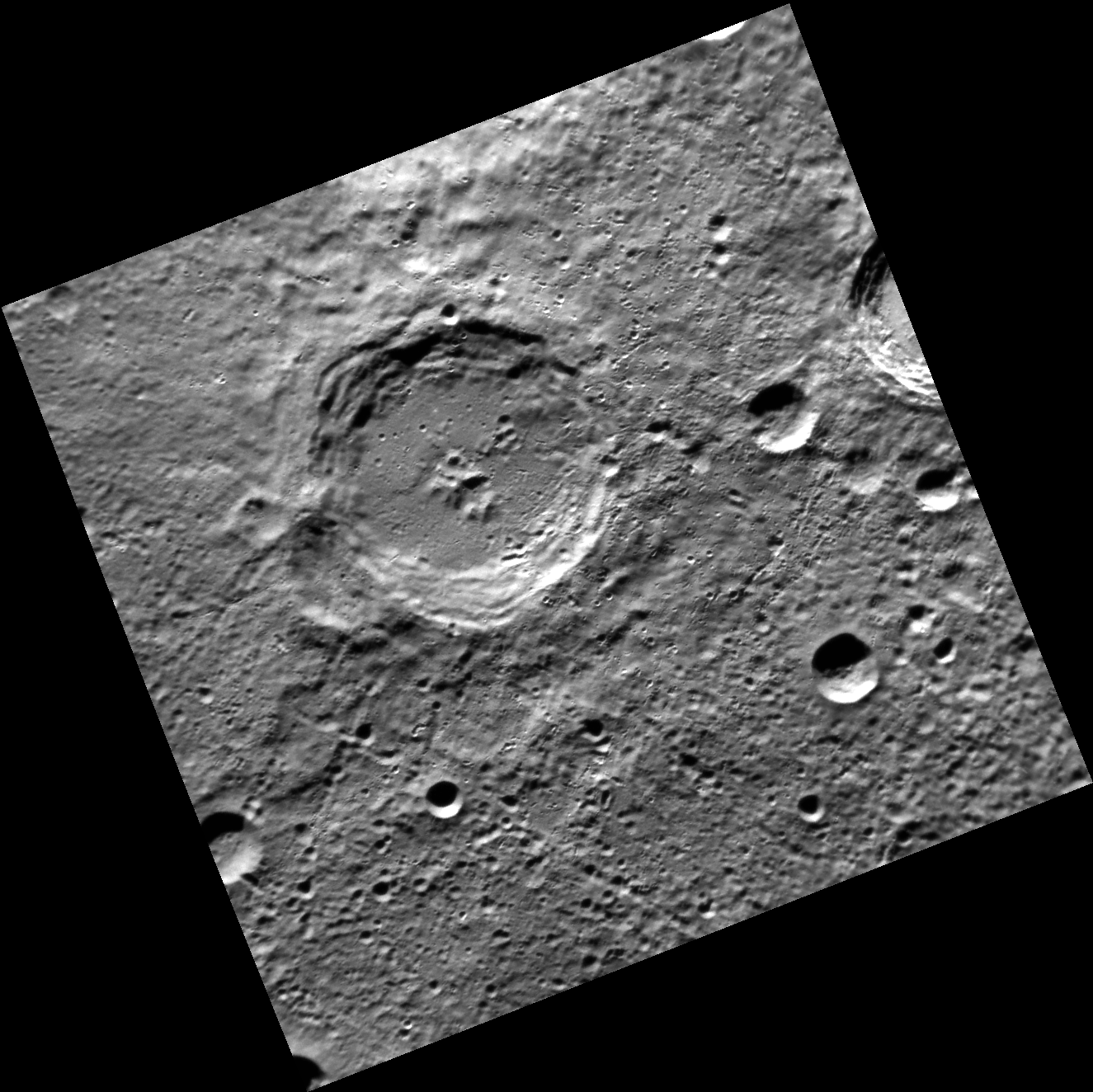
- MESSENGER NAC image of Dickens
- Feature type: Central-peak impact crater
- Location: Bach quadrangle, Mercury
- Coordinates: 72.9°S 153.3°W
- Diameter: 78 km (48 mi)
- Eponym: Charles Dickens

Dickens is a crater on Mercury. It has a diameter of 78 kilometers. Its name was adopted by the International Astronomical Union (IAU) in 1976. Dickens is named for the English novelist Charles Dickens, who lived from 1812 to 1870. The crater was first imaged by Mariner 10 in 1974.

The crater Keats is north of Dickens, Han Kan is to the northeast, and Martí is to the southwest.

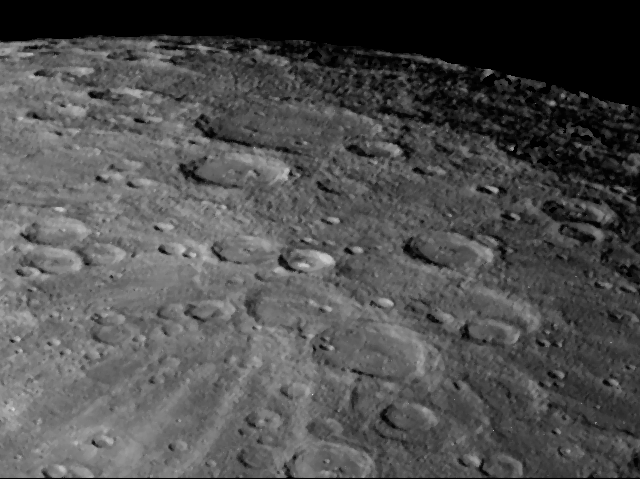
Mariner 10 image with Dickens right of center

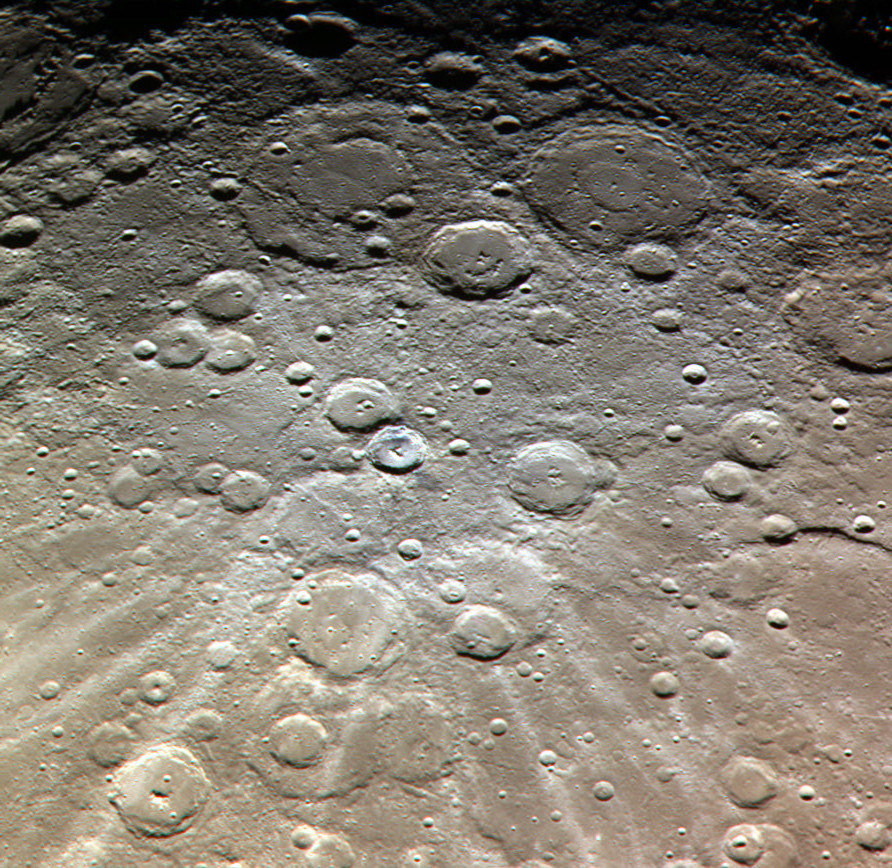
Exaggerated color image by MESSENGER with Dickens right of center

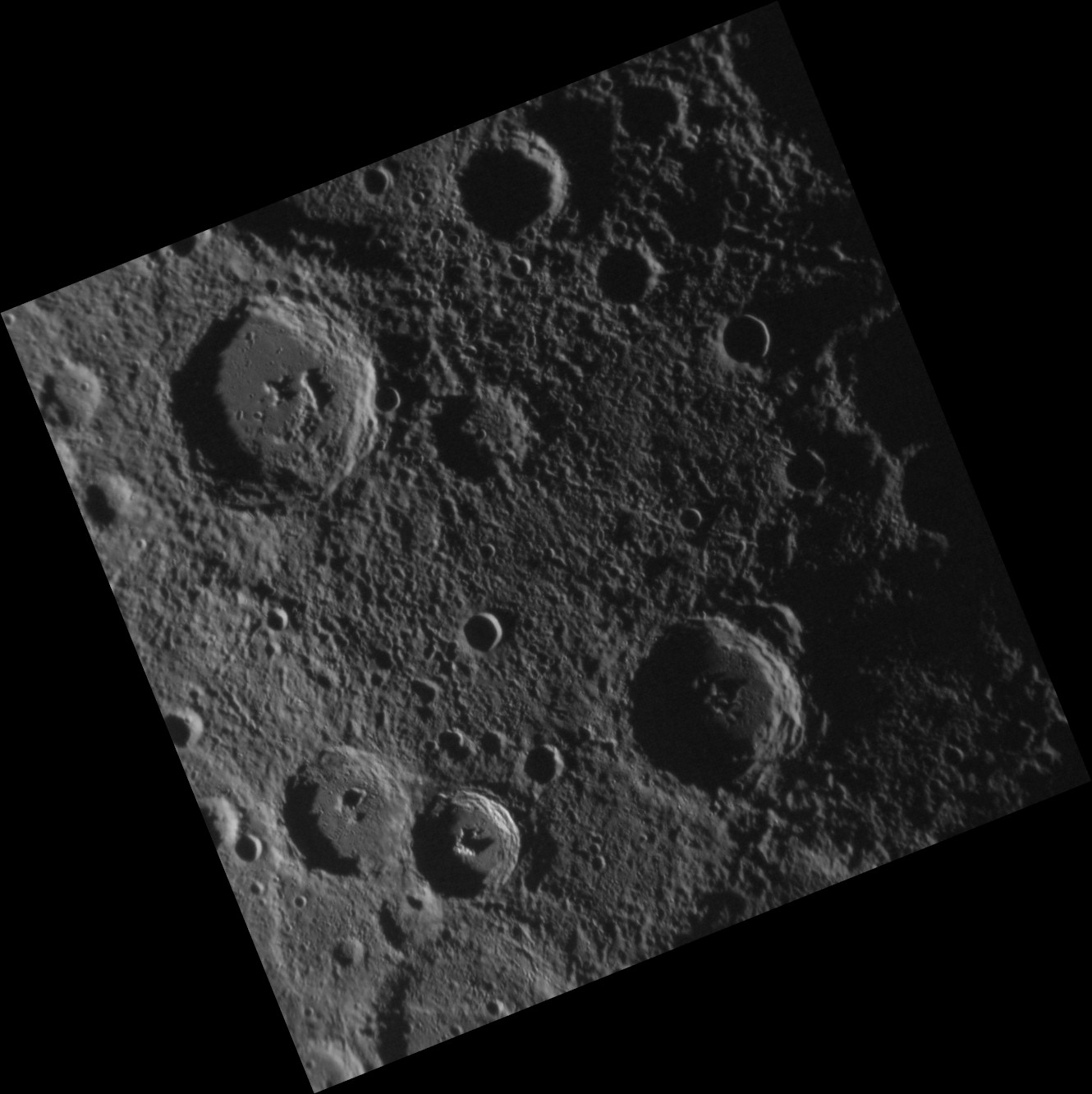
Han Kan (bottom center), Van Gogh (upper left), and Dickens (right) craters
