= Bernini (crater) =

Crater on Mercury

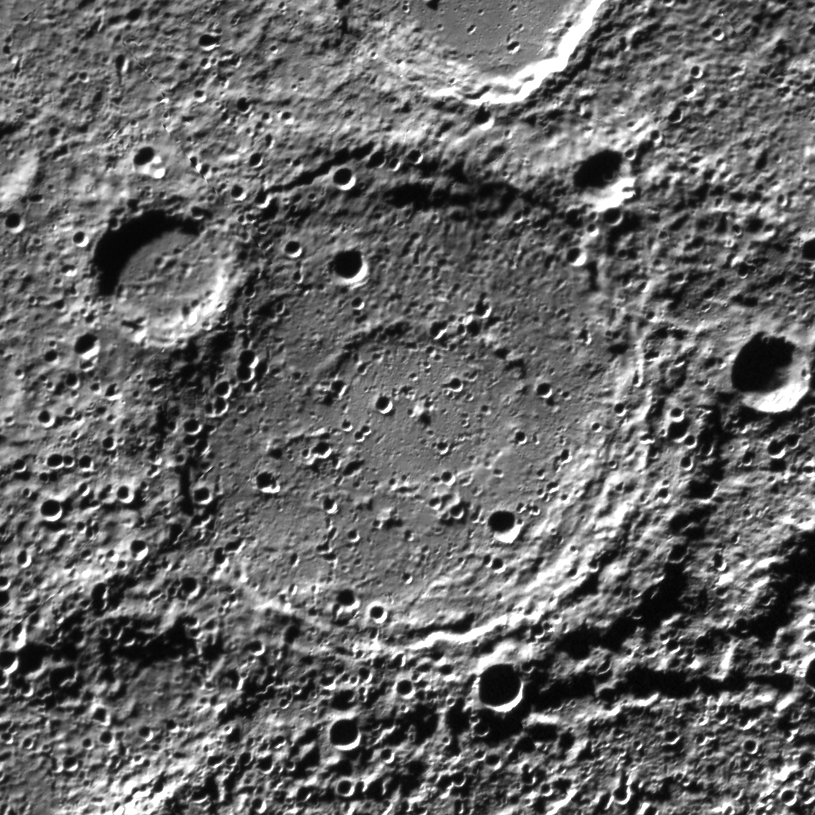
- MESSENGER mosaic of Bernini
- Feature type: Peak-ring impact basin
- Location: Bach quadrangle, Mercury
- Coordinates: 79.2°S 136.5°W
- Diameter: 146 km
- Eponym: Gian Lorenzo Bernini

Bernini is a crater on Mercury. It has a diameter of 146 kilometers. Its name was adopted by the International Astronomical Union (IAU) in 1976. Bernini is named for the Italian architect and sculptor Gian Lorenzo Bernini, who lived from 1598 to 1680.

Bernini is one of 110 peak ring basins on Mercury.

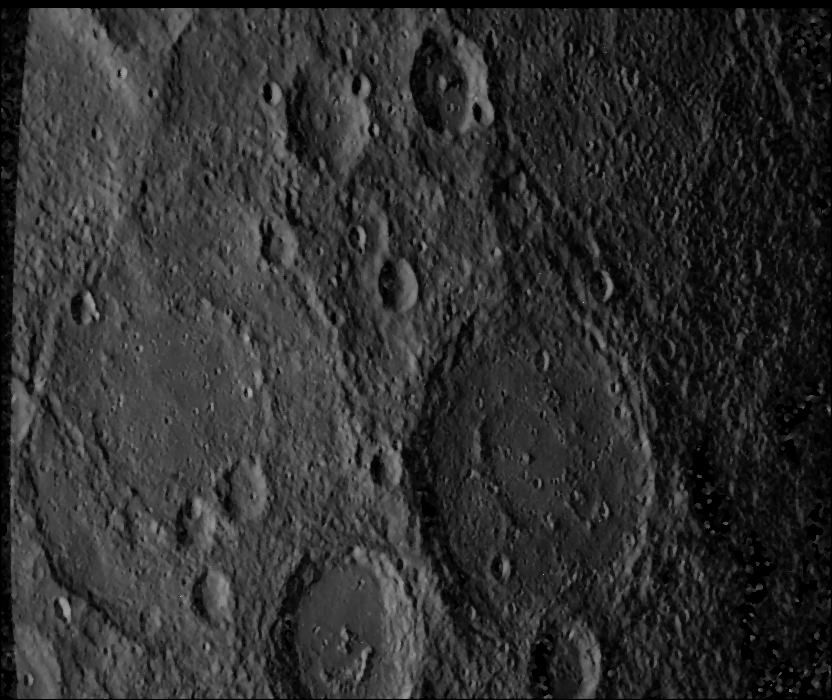
Mariner 10 image with Bernini at right and Cervantes at left

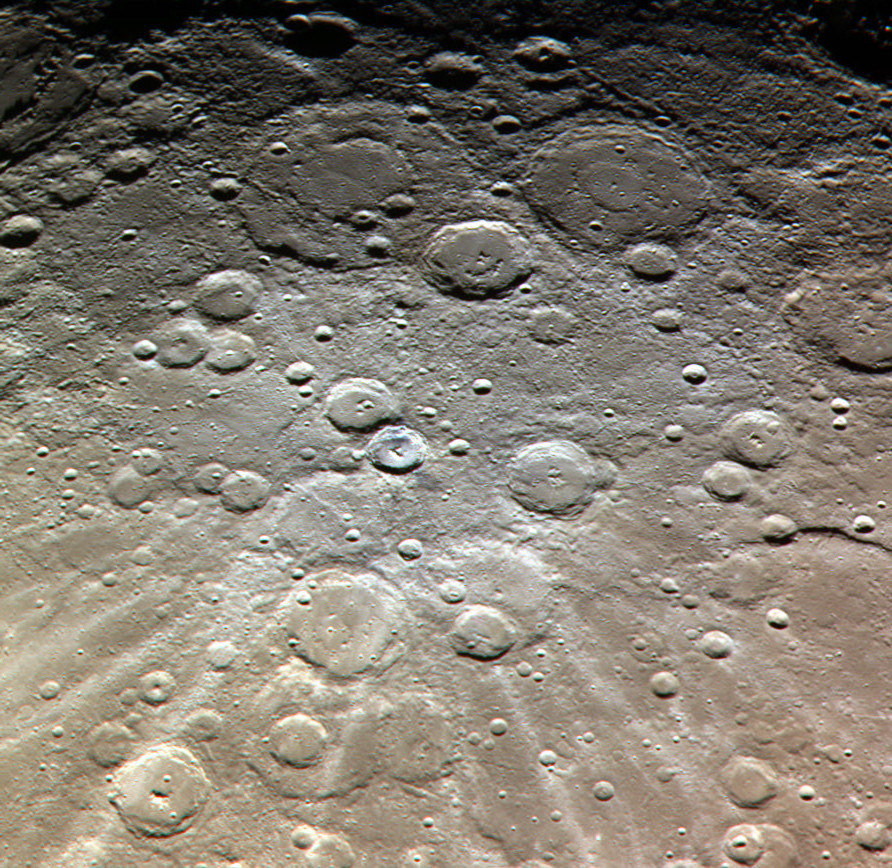
Exaggerated color image by MESSENGER with Bernini, Cervantes, and Van Gogh at top
