= Cervantes (crater) =

Crater on Mercury

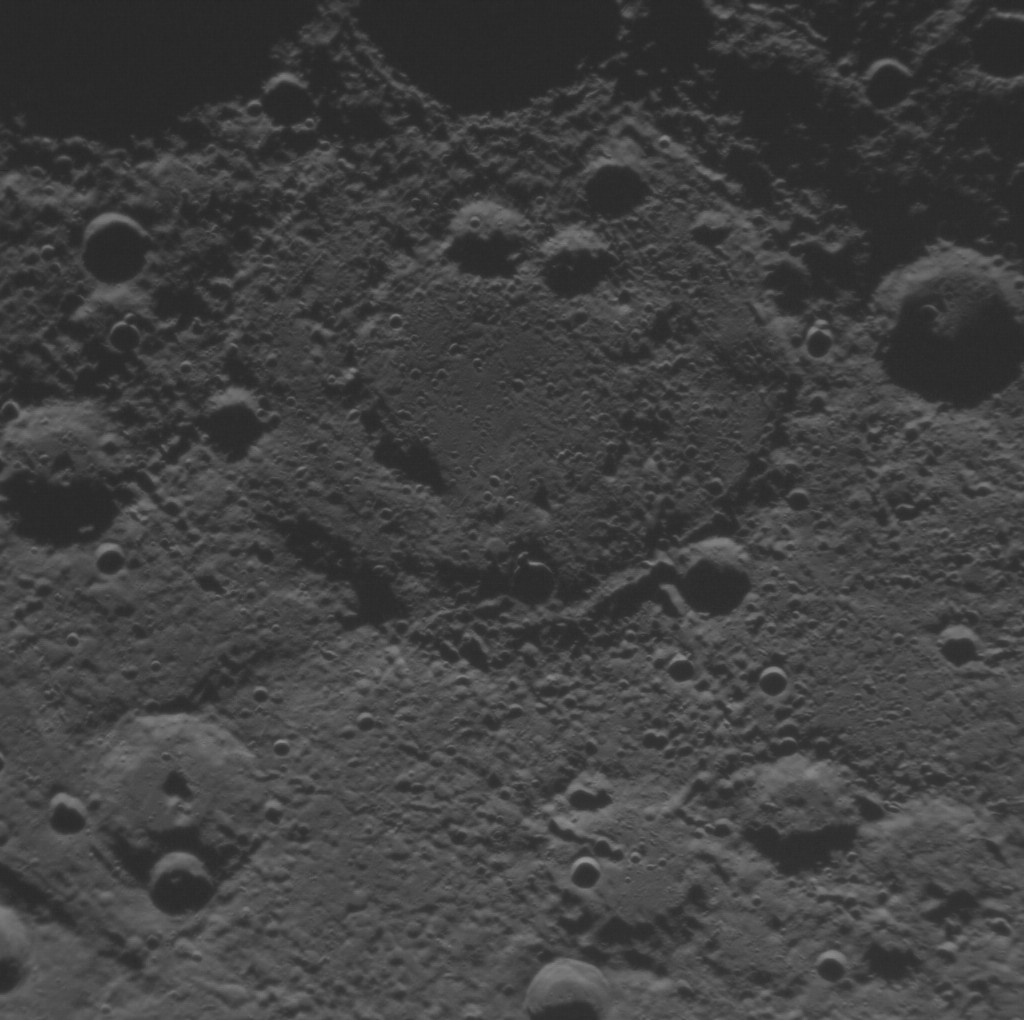
- MESSENGER NAC of Cervantes
- Feature type: Impact crater
- Location: Bach quadrangle, Mercury
- Coordinates: 74.6°S 122.0°W
- Diameter: 181 km
- Eponym: Miguel de Cervantes

Cervantes is a crater on Mercury. It has a diameter of 181 kilometers. Its name was adopted by the International Astronomical Union in 1976. Cervantes is named for the Spanish writer Miguel de Cervantes, who lived from 1547 to 1616.

Cervantes is one of 110 peak ring basins on Mercury.

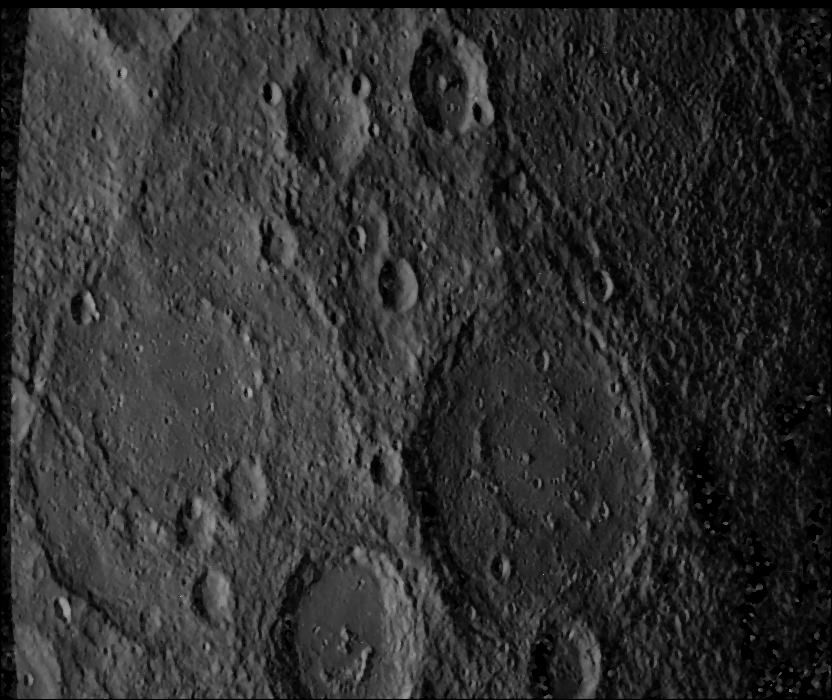
Mariner 10 image with Bernini at right and Cervantes at left

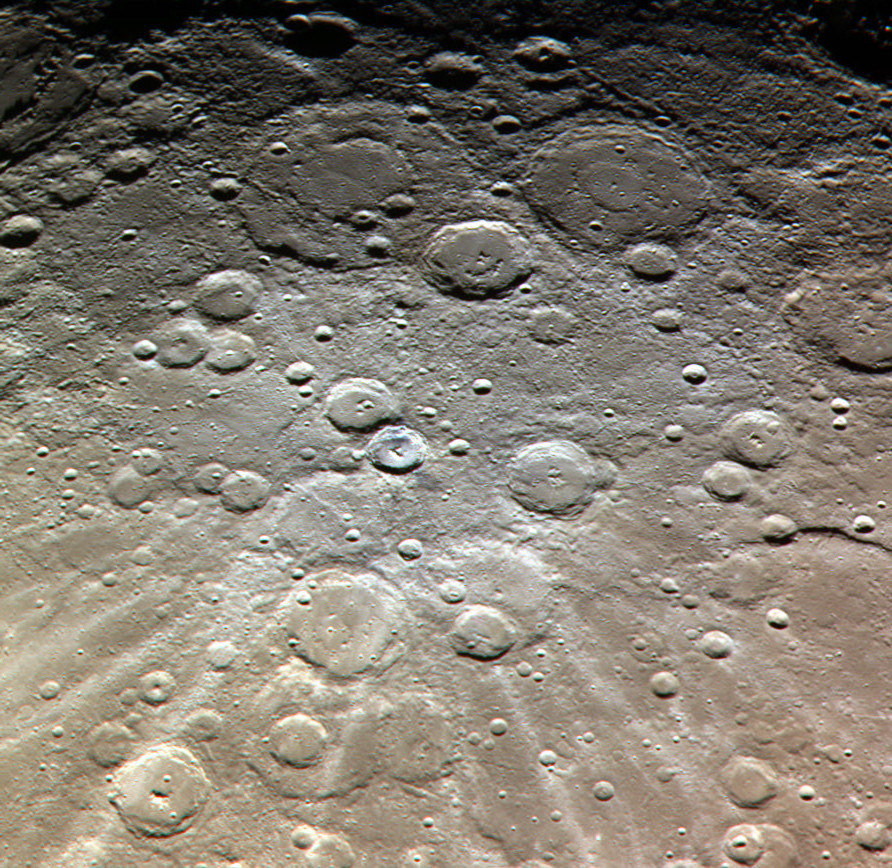
Exaggerated color image by MESSENGER with Bernini, Cervantes, and Van Gogh at top
