= Bach (crater) =

Crater on Mercury

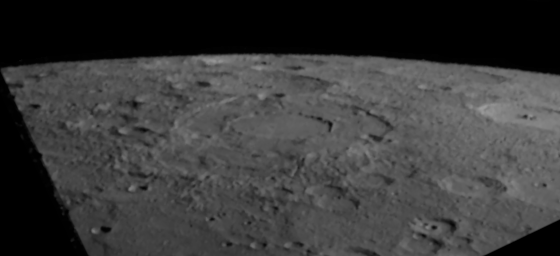
- Oblique Mariner 10 image with Bach at center
- Feature type: Peak-ring impact basin
- Location: Bach quadrangle, Mercury
- Coordinates: 69.86°S 103.01°W
- Diameter: 214 km
- Eponym: Johann Sebastian Bach

Bach is a double-ringed impact basin within the Bach quadrangle of Mercury. It was named by the IAU in 1976. The crater was first imaged by Mariner 10 in 1974.

Bach is one of 110 peak ring basins on Mercury.

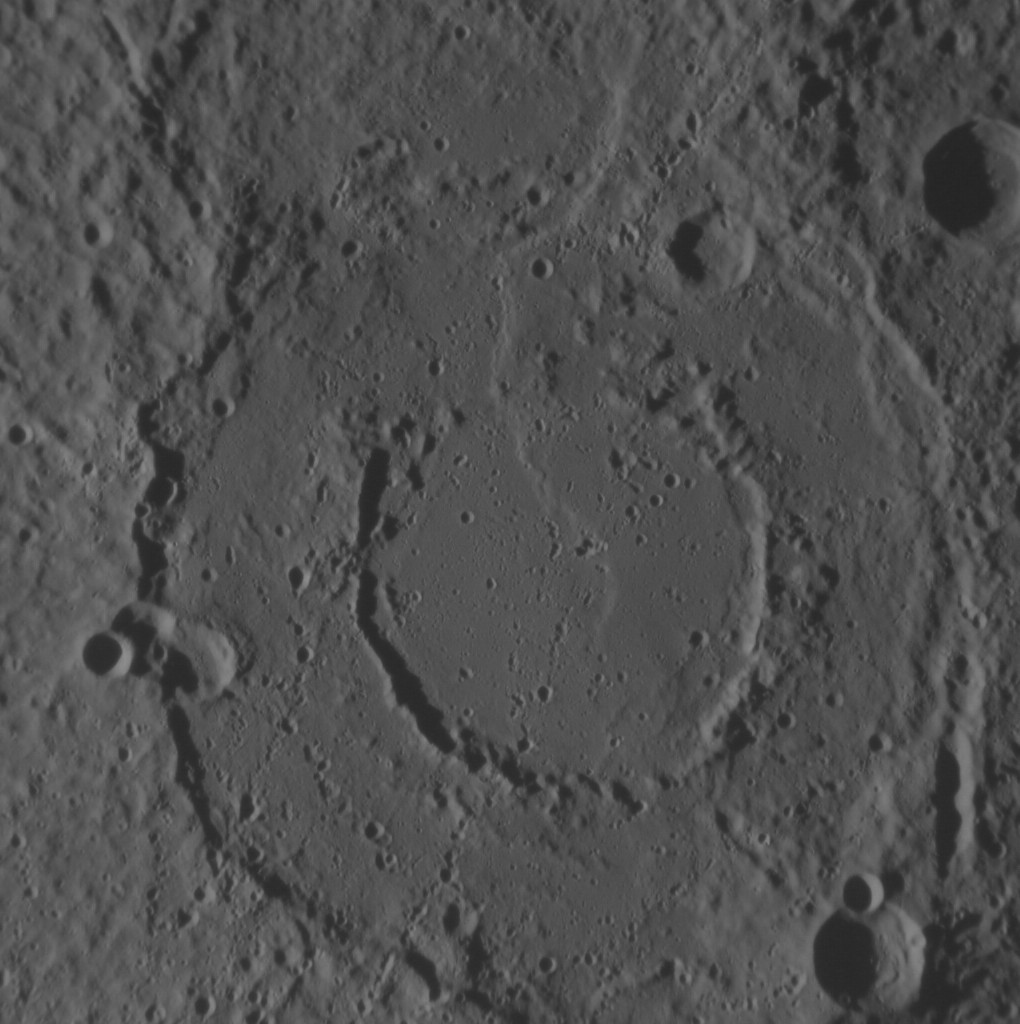
MESSENGER image

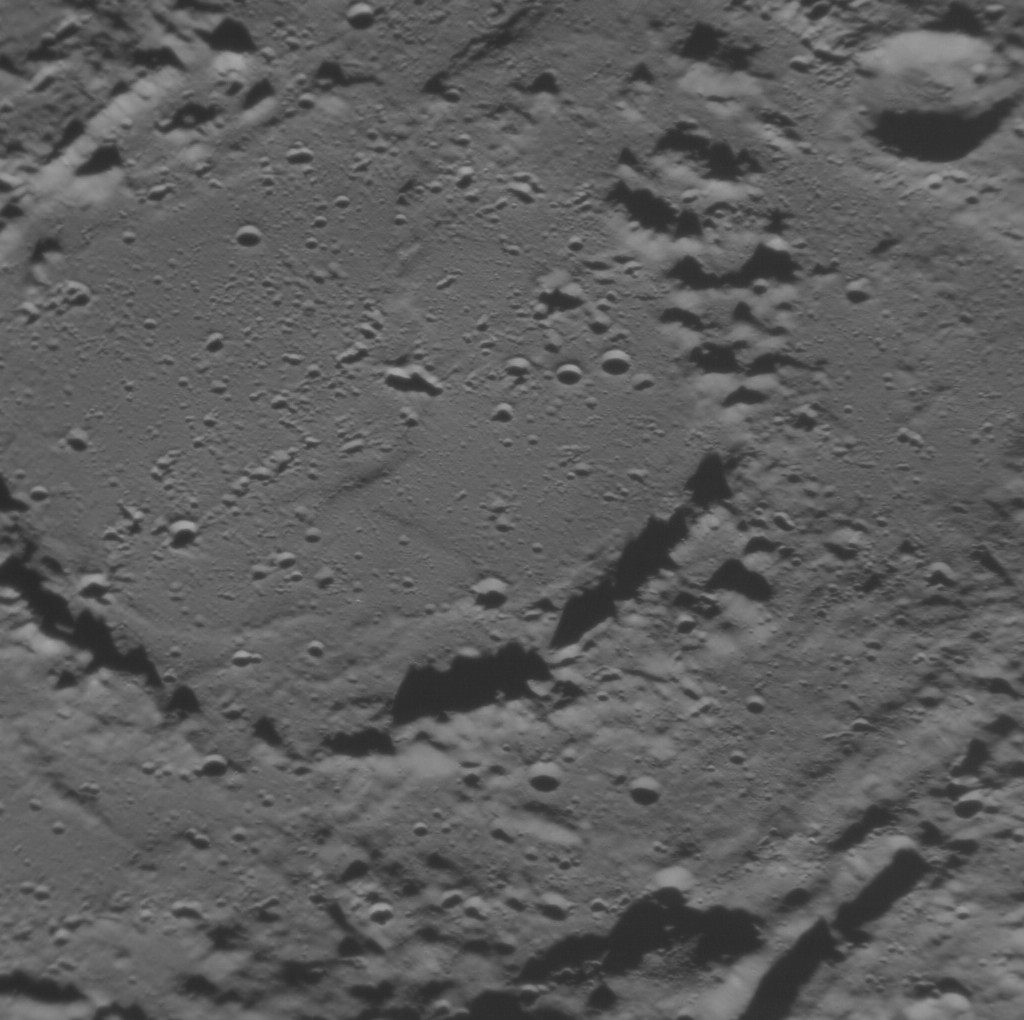
Bach crater interior
