= Martí (crater) =

Crater on Mercury

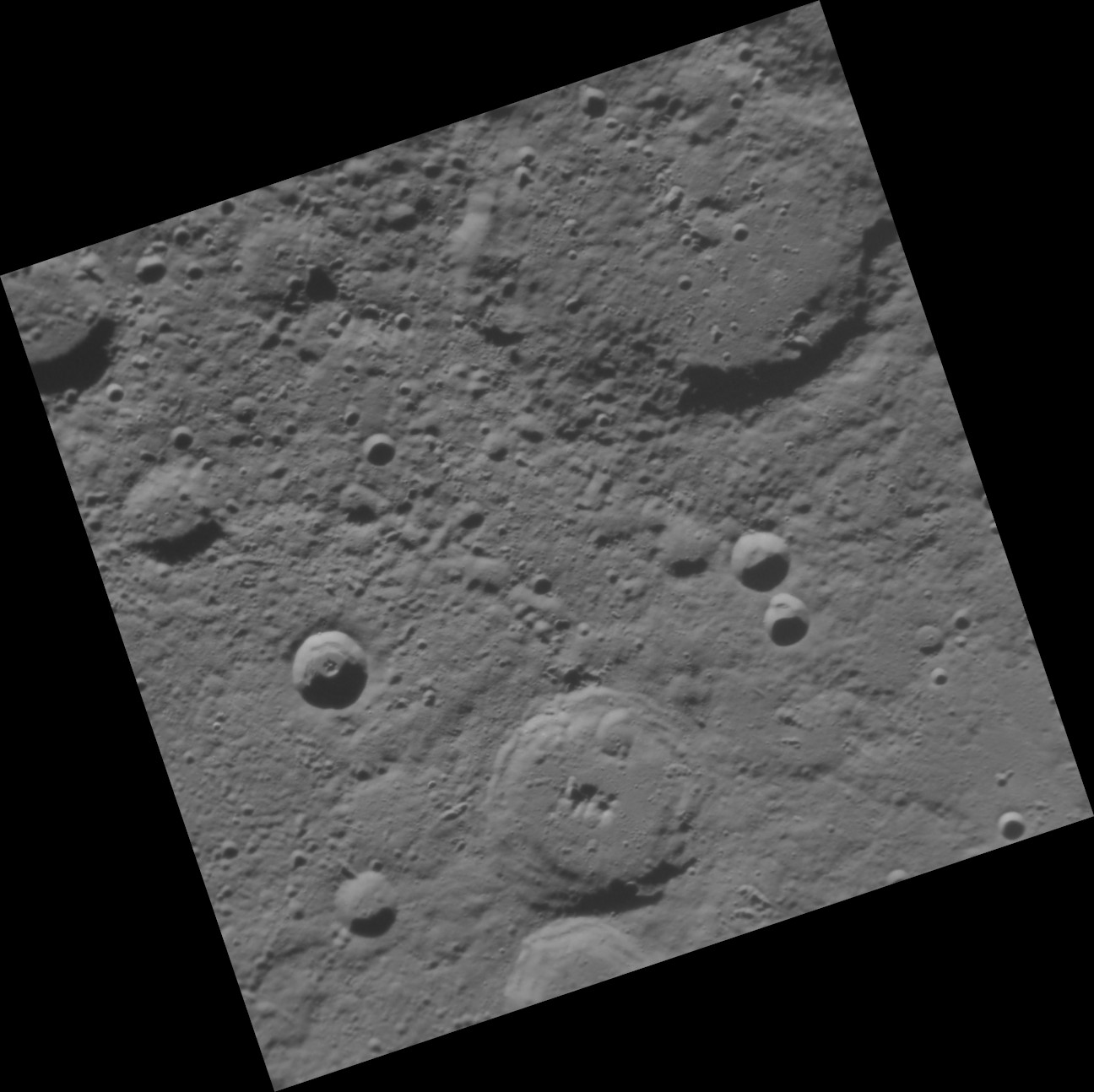
- MESSENGER NAC with Martí at bottom center
- Feature type: Impact crater
- Location: Bach quadrangle, Mercury
- Coordinates: 75.96°S 191.74°W
- Diameter: 69.48 km (43.17 mi)
- Eponym: José Martí

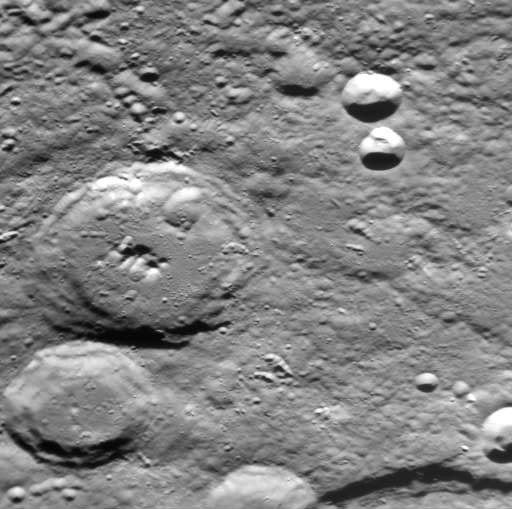
Oblique view with Martí at left

Martí is a crater on Mercury. Its name was adopted by the International Astronomical Union (IAU) in 1976. Martí is named for the Cuban writer José Martí, who lived from 1853 to 1895.
