= Callicrates =

5th-century BC Greek architect

Callicrates or Kallikrates (/kəˈlɪkrəˌtiːz/; Greek: Καλλικράτης [Kaliˈkratis]) was an ancient Greek architect active in the middle of the fifth century BC. He and Ictinus were architects of the Parthenon (Plutarch, Pericles, 13). An inscription identifies him as the architect of "the Temple of Nike" on the Acropolis of Athens (IG I^{3} 35). The temple in question is either the amphiprostyle Temple of Athena Nike now visible on the site or a small-scale predecessor (naiskos) whose remains were found in the later temple's foundations.

An inscription identifies Callicrates as one of the architects of the Classical circuit wall of the Acropolis (IG I^{3} 45), and Plutarch further states (loc. cit.) that he was contracted to build the middle of three defensive walls linking Athens and Piraeus.

A crater on the planet Mercury was named in his honor.

== Sources ==
- Plutarch, Pericles 13
