= Callicrates (crater) =

Crater on Mercury

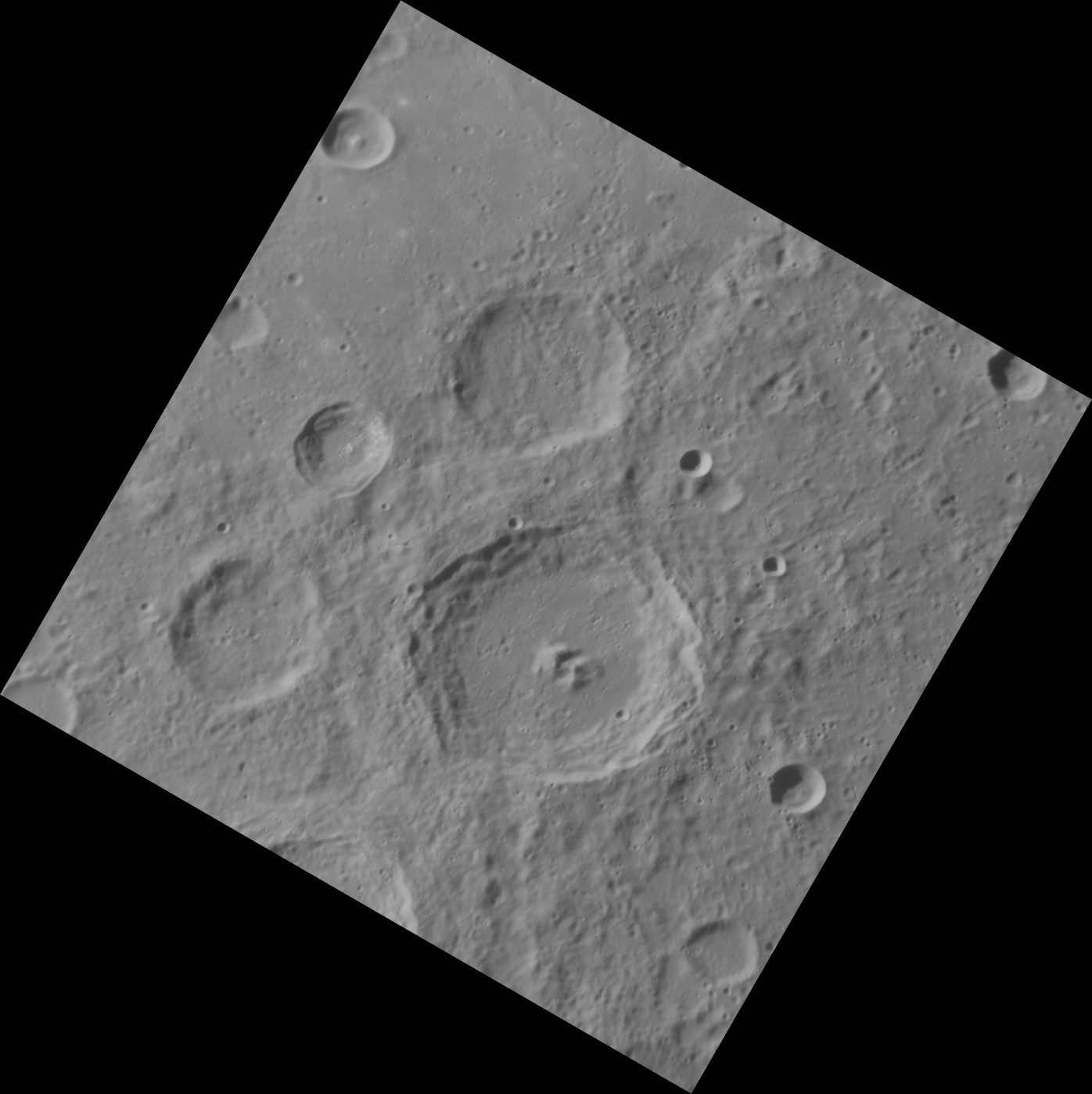
- MESSENGER NAC of Callicrates
- Feature type: Impact crater
- Location: Bach quadrangle, Mercury
- Coordinates: 66.51°S 30.37°W
- Diameter: 68 km (42 mi)
- Eponym: Callicrates

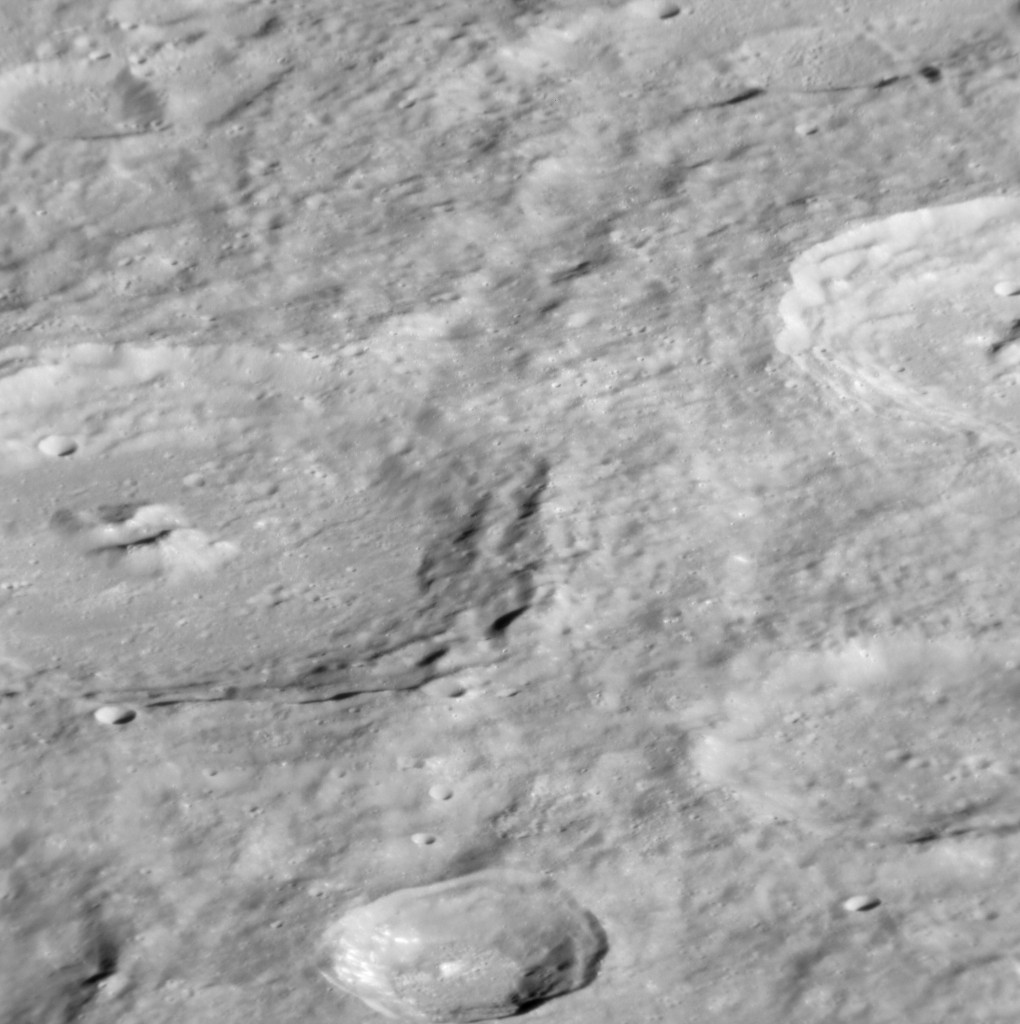
Oblique view

Callicrates is a crater on Mercury. Its name was adopted by the International Astronomical Union in 1976. Callicrates is named for the Greek architect Callicrates, who lived in the 5th century BCE.
