= Han Kan (crater) =

Crater on Mercury

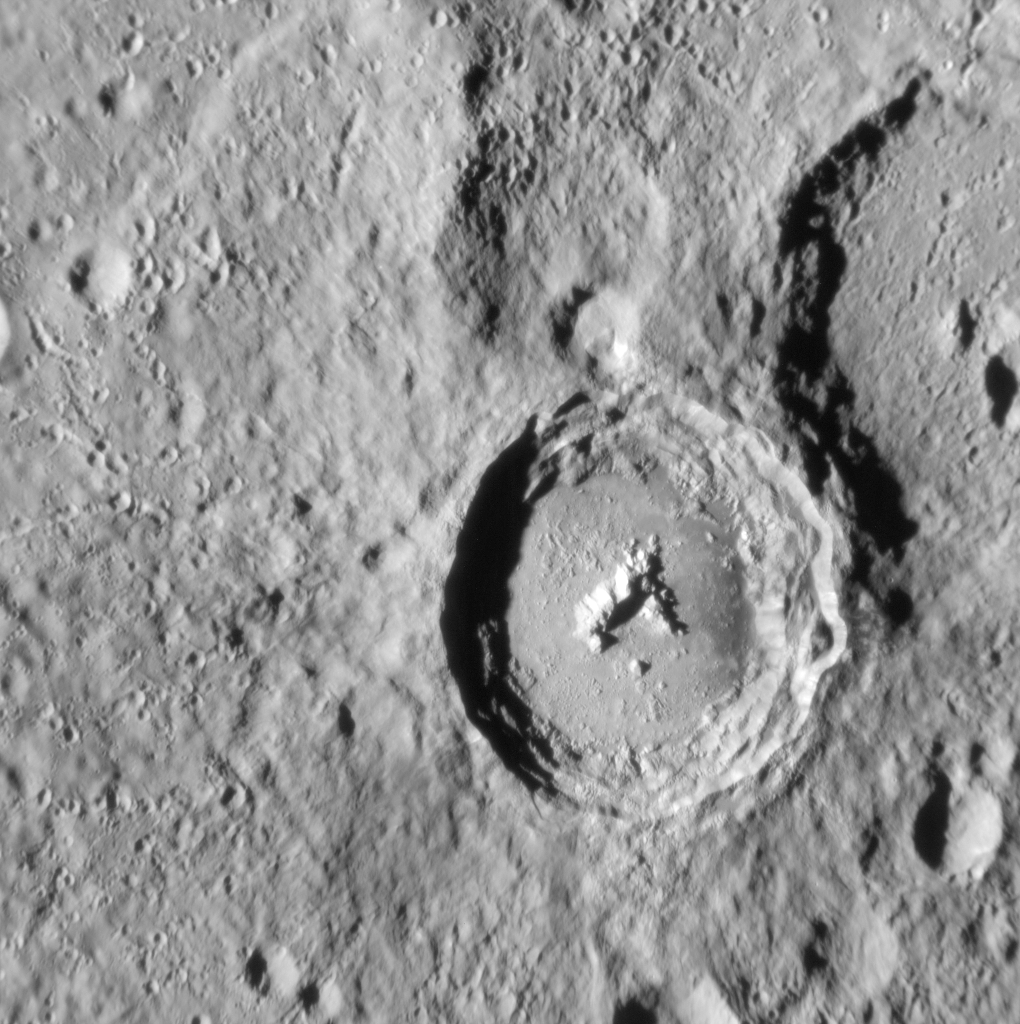
- MESSENGER NAC image of Han Kan, slightly right of center
- Feature type: Central-peak impact crater
- Location: Bach quadrangle, Mercury
- Coordinates: 72.13°S 146.40°W
- Diameter: 50.0 km (31.1 mi)
- Eponym: Han Gan

Han Kan is a crater on Mercury. It has a diameter of 50 kilometers. Its name was adopted by the International Astronomical Union (IAU) in 1985. Han Kan is named for the Chinese painter Han Gan, who lived from 720 to 780. The crater was first imaged by Mariner 10 in 1974.

On the eastern floor of Han Kan is a dark spot of low reflectance material (LRM), closely associated with hollows.

Han Kan has an extensive ray system extending for hundreds of kilometers.

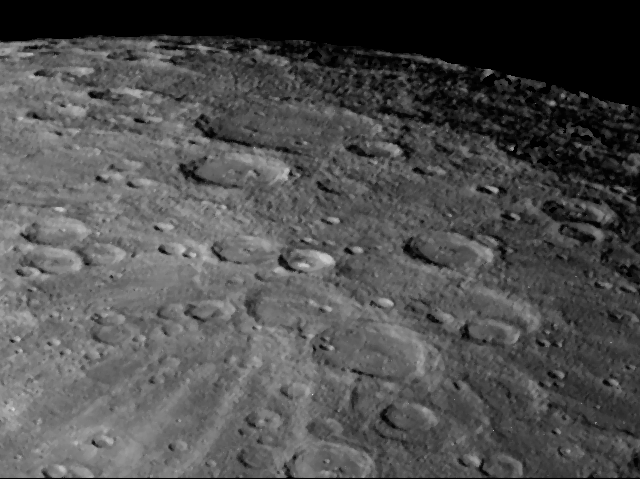
Mariner 10 image with Han Kan at center

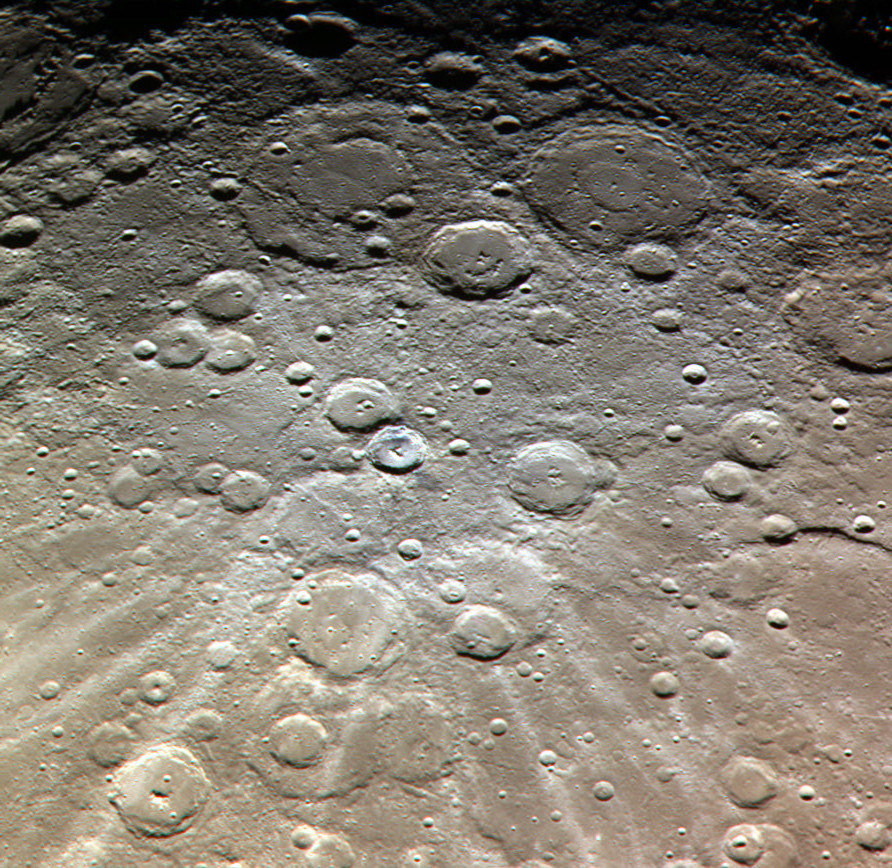
Exaggerated color image by MESSENGER with Han Kan at center

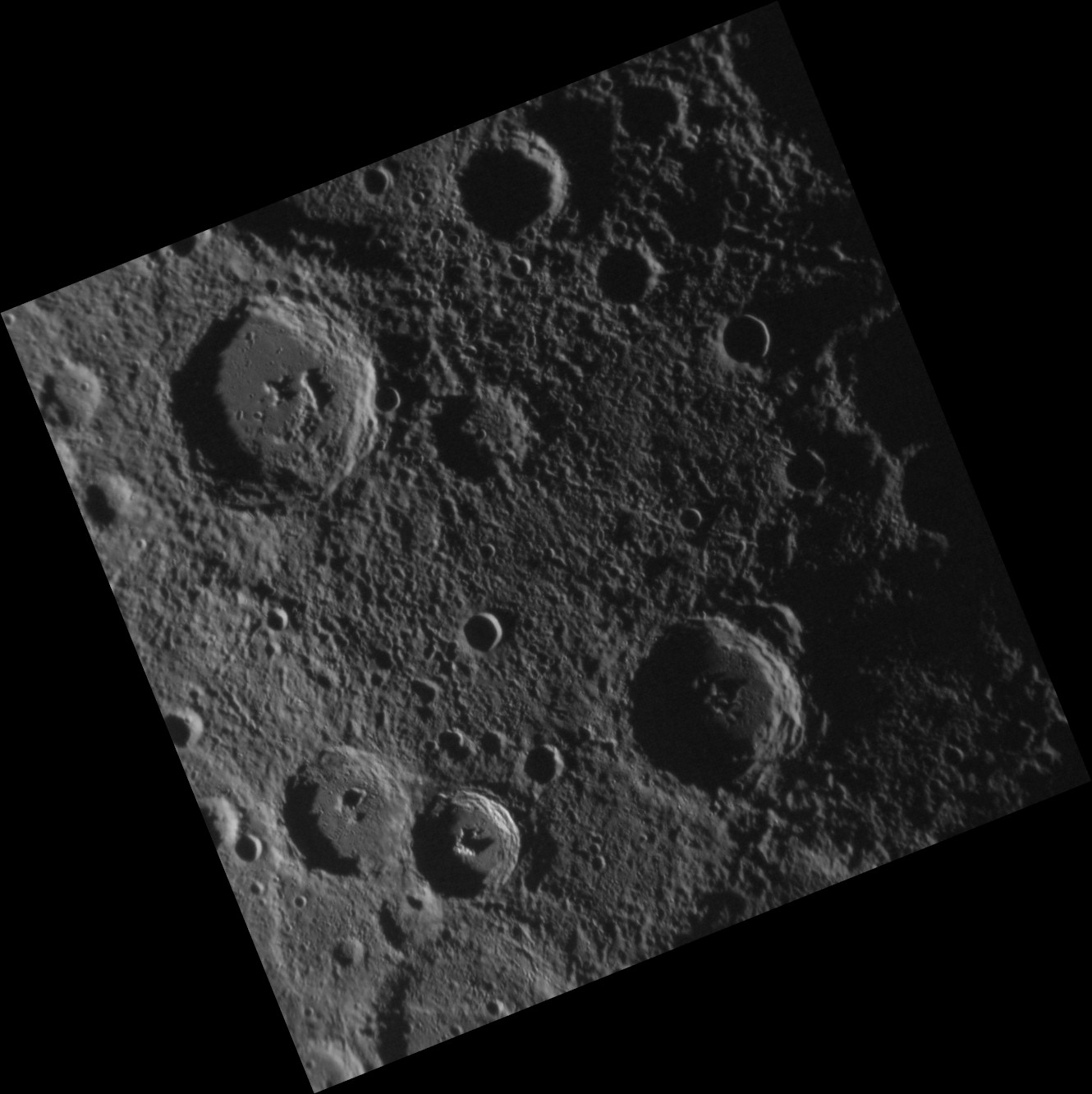
Han Kan (bottom center), Van Gogh (upper left), and Dickens (right) craters
