= Shevchenko (crater) =

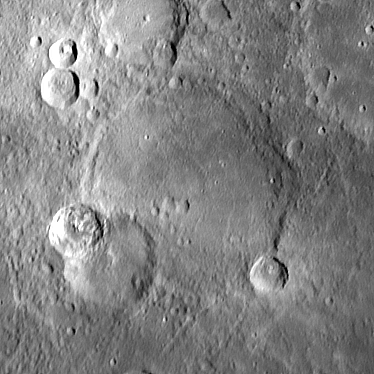
- MESSENGER WAC mosaic
- Planet: Mercury
- Coordinates: 53.64°S 46.02°W
- Quadrangle: Discovery
- Diameter: 143 km (89 mi)
- Eponym: Taras Hryhorovych Shevchenko

Shevchenko is a crater on Mercury. Its name was adopted by the International Astronomical Union (IAU) in 1976, for Ukrainian poet Taras Hryhorovych Shevchenko.

On the west rim of Shevchenko is an unnamed smaller crater that has sharp features and contains hollows.

To the southwest of Shevchenko is Khansa crater. To the northeast is Africanus Horton, and to the east are Rameau and the Discovery Rupes.

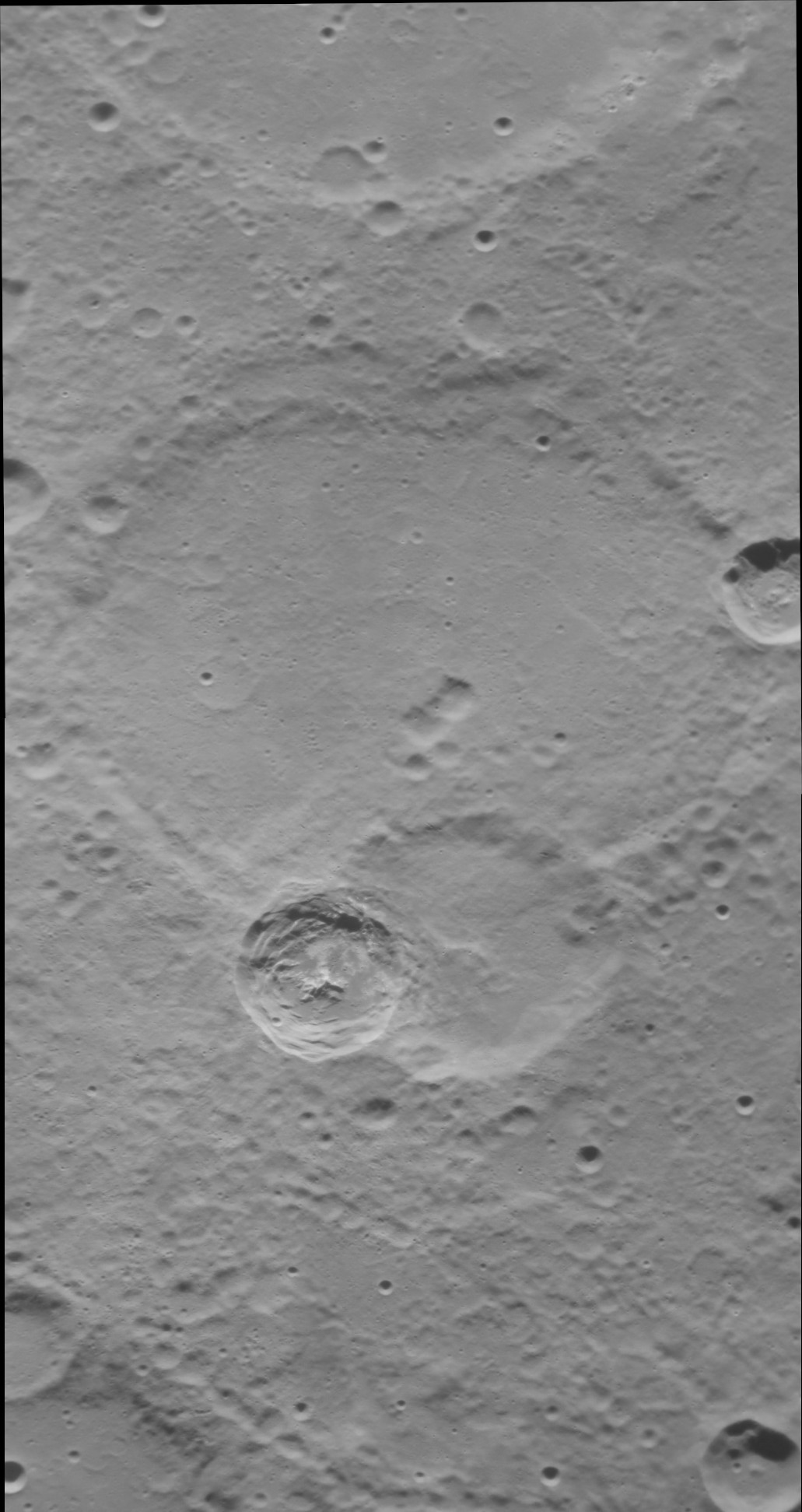
NAC mosaic with north at left

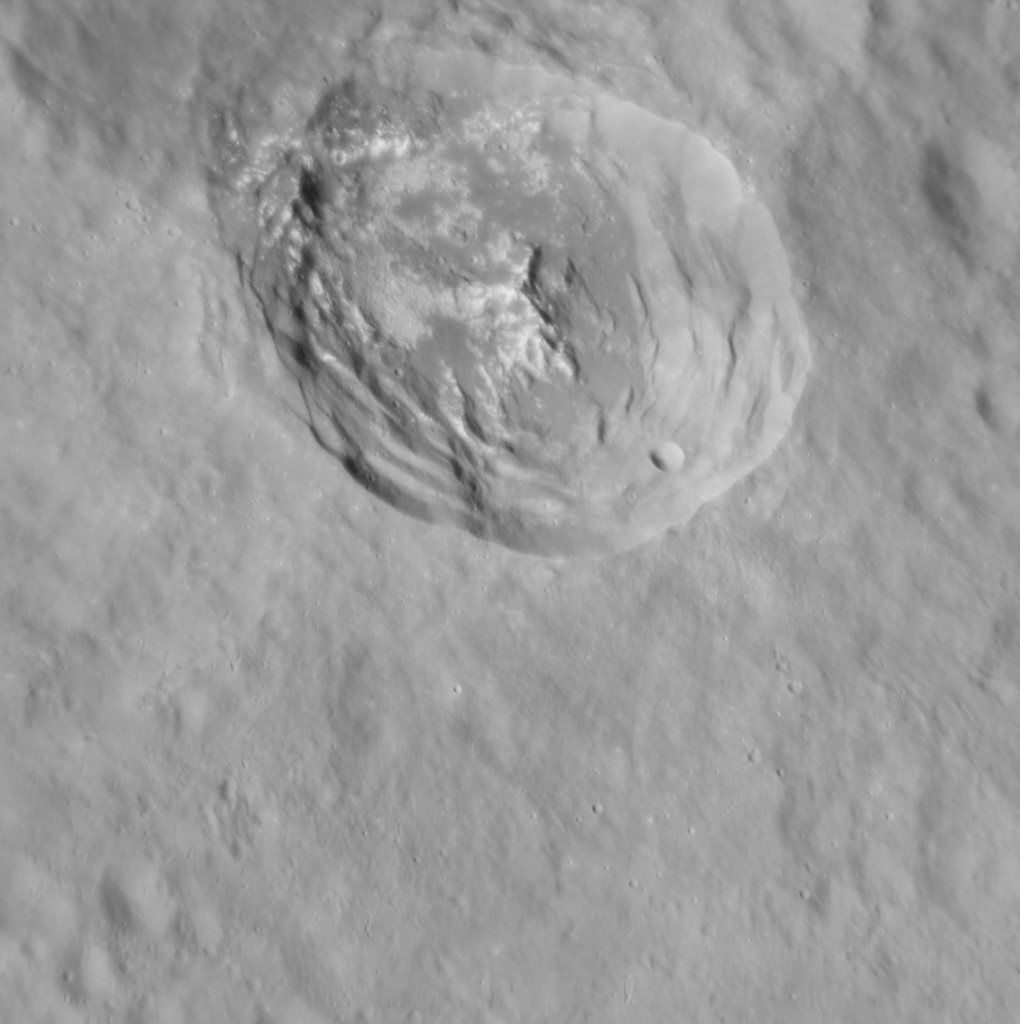
Unnamed crater with hollows west of Shevchenko crater
