= Africanus Horton (crater) =

Crater on Mercury

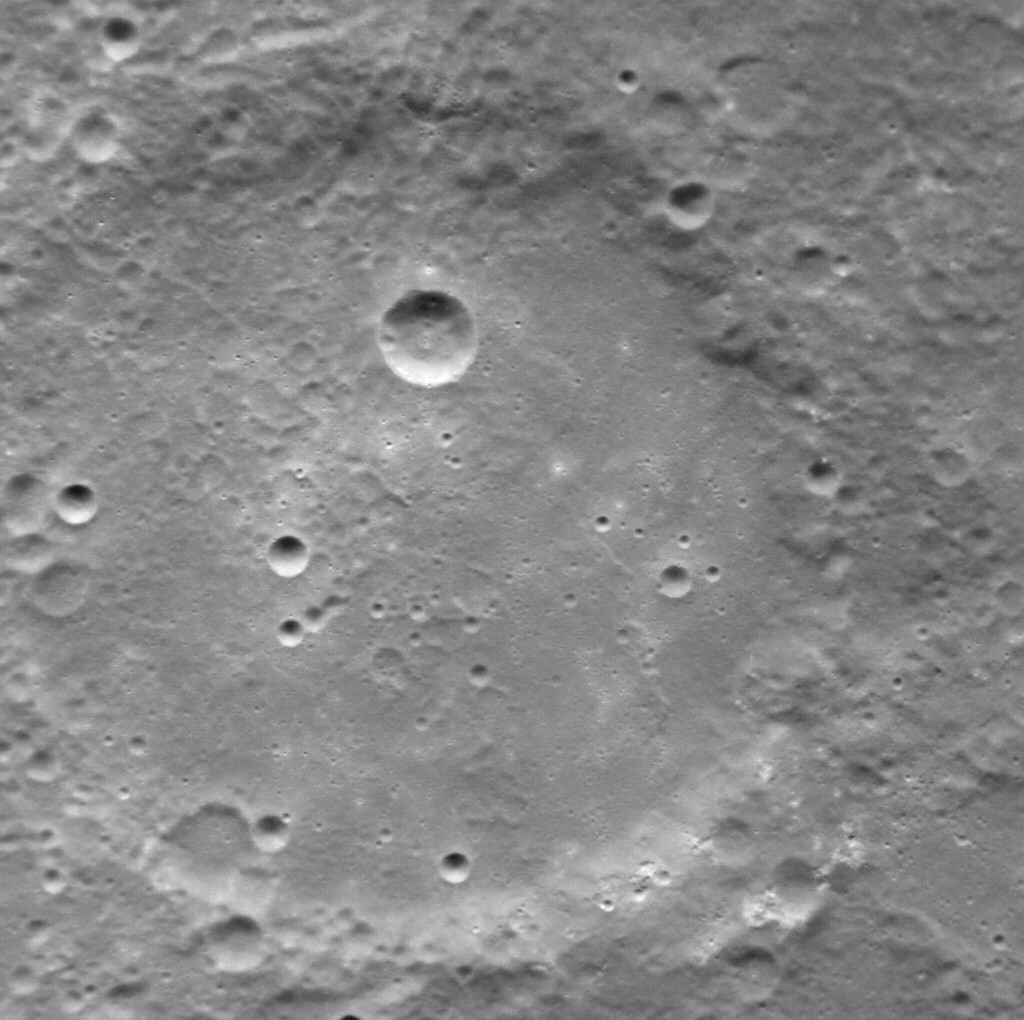
- MESSENGER NAC image of Africanus Horton
- Feature type: Impact crater
- Location: Discovery quadrangle, Mercury
- Coordinates: 50.96°S 41.19°W
- Diameter: 140 km
- Eponym: Africanus Horton

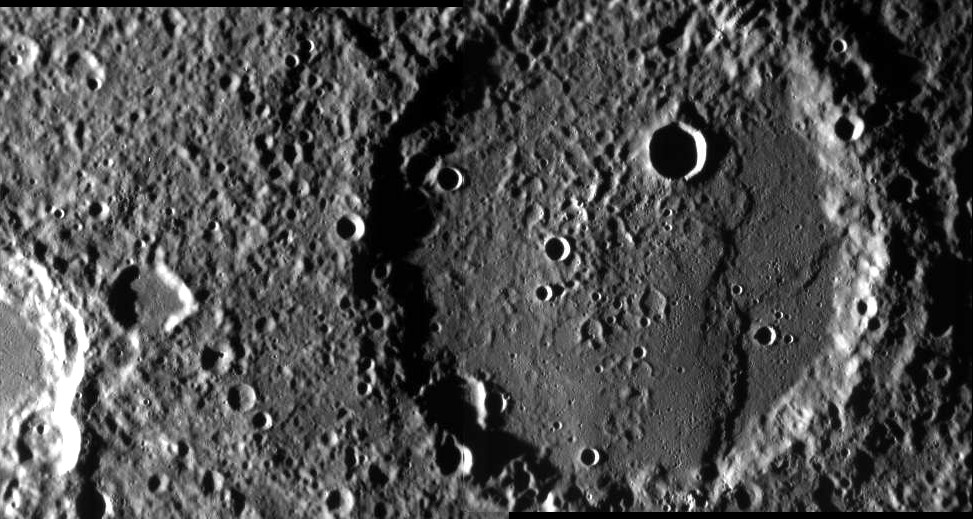
Mosaic of MESSENGER images

Africanus Horton is a circular impact crater on Mercury. It was named by the IAU in 1976, after Africanus Horton, a Creole African nationalist writer and an esteemed medical surgeon in the British Army from Freetown, Sierra Leone.

The crater Andal is to the northeast of Africanus Horton, and Shevchenko is to the southwest. The crater Rameau and Discovery Rupes are to the southeast.
