= Andal (crater) =

Crater on Mercury

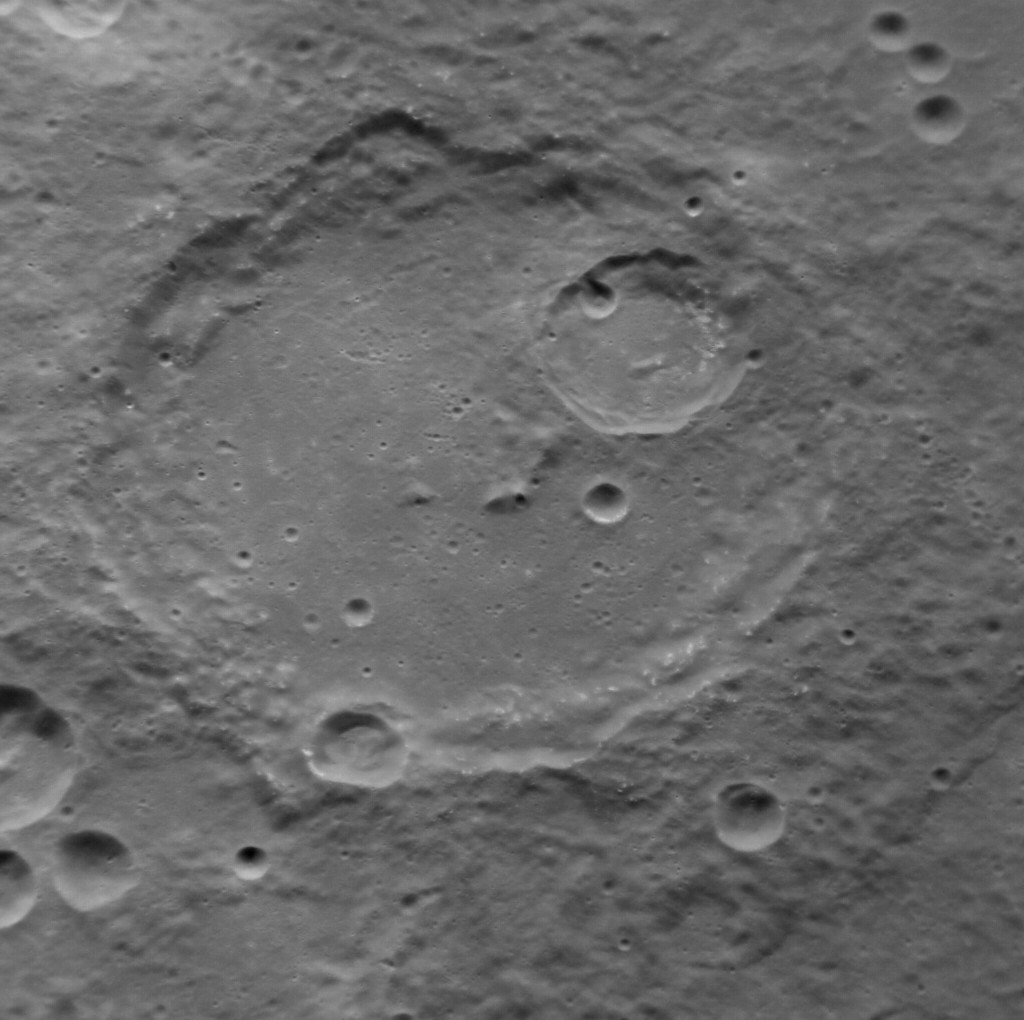
- MESSENGER image
- Feature type: Impact crater
- Location: Mercury
- Coordinates: 47.52°S 37.71°W
- Diameter: 109 km (68 mi)
- Eponym: Andal

Andal is a crater on Mercury. Its name was adopted by the International Astronomical Union in 1976. Andal is named for the Tamil writer Andal, who lived in the 10th century.

The crater Africanus Horton is to the southwest of Andal.
