= List of albedo features on Mercury =

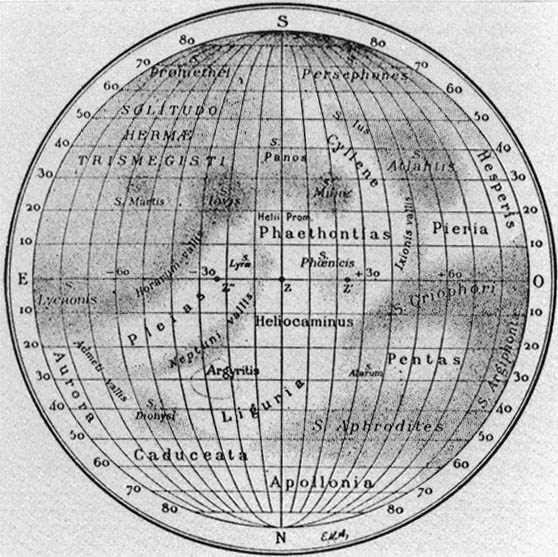
A 1934 map showing some of Mercury's albedo features

This is a list of the albedo features of the planet Mercury as seen by early telescopic observation.

Early telescopic observations of Mercury were based on the assumption that Mercury keeps one of its faces permanently turned toward the Sun, through the mechanism of tidal locking. Although this is not true (Mercury rotates three times on its axis for every two revolutions around the Sun), when it is positioned for best viewing from Earth, the amount by which its visible face has rotated from its previous best viewing position is fairly small.

A map of Mercury made in the 1910s by astronomer Eugène Michel Antoniadi shows the following albedo features, localized by a grid in which 0° longitude is the (assumed) subsolar meridian. No certain connection has been made between these features and the topographic features viewed on Mercury by the Mariner 10 spacecraft. Mariner 10, however, imaged less than half of Mercury's surface.

The names are drawn from Greek mythology, and often allude to myths about Hermes, the Greek equivalent of the Roman god Mercury.

== List of albedo features on Mercury ==
Name	Pronunciation	Location	Meaning of name
Admeti Vallis	/ædˈmiːtaɪ ˈvælɪs/	Dark area in the NE quadrant, between Aurora and Pleias	"valley of Admetus"
Apollonia	/ˌæpəˈloʊniə/	Light area near the north pole	"land of Apollo"
Argyritis	/ˌɑːrdʒɪˈraɪtɪs/	Light area in the NE quadrant, about 30° N	"silver-bearing land"
Aurora	/ɒˈrɔːrə/	Light area, 20-30° N, near the eastern terminator	Aurora, the Roman goddess of dawn
Caduceata	/kəˌdjuːʃiːˈeɪtə/	Light area in the NE quadrant, north of 50° N	"possessing the caduceus"
Cyllene	/sɪˈliːni/	Light area in the SW quadrant, extending from about 20° to 50° S	Cyllene, birthplace of Hermes
Helii Promontorium	/ˈhiːliaɪ ˌprɒmənˈtɔːriəm/	A feature close to the zero meridian, about 20° S	Means "cape of Helios"
Heliocaminus	/ˌhiːliəkəˈmaɪnəs/	Light region in the northern hemisphere, between Phaëthontias and Liguria	"chamber exposed to the sun"; the region is close to the (assumed) sub-solar point
Hesperis	/ˈhɛspərɪs/	Light region in the SW quadrant, between 10° and 40° S, near the western terminator	"one of the Hesperides"
Horarum Vallis	/hɒˈrɛərəm ˈvælɪs/	Dark narrow area in the eastern hemisphere, crossing the Equator SE of Pleias	"valley of the Hours"
Ixionis Vallis	/ɪkˈsaɪənɪs ˈvælɪs/	Band connecting Solitudo Atlantis and Solitudo Criophori, in SW quadrant between the Equator and 30° S	"valley of Ixion"
Liguria	/lɪˈɡjʊəriə/	Light area in the southern hemisphere, centered slightly west of the zero meridian, at about 40° N	Liguria, a region of Italy
Neptuni Vallis	/nɛpˈtjuːnaɪ ˈvælɪs/	Dark narrow area in the NE quadrant, NW of Pleias	"valley of Neptune"
Pentas	/ˈpɛntəs/	Light region in the NW quadrant, between the solitudines of Criophori and Aphrodites, extending between about 10° and 40° N	
Phaëthontias	/ˌfeɪəˈθɒnʃəs/	Light region in the southern hemisphere, between Pleias and Pieria	"land of Phaëthon"
Pieria	/paɪˈɪəriə/	Light region in the SW quadrant, bordering on Hesperis, between the solitudines of Atlantis and Criophori	Pieria, a region of Greece
Pleias	/ˈpliːəs/ or /ˈplaɪəs/	Light region in the eastern hemisphere, running across the Equator from SW to NE	"one of the Pleiades"
Solitudo Alarum	/ˌsɒlɪˈtjuːdoʊ əˈlɛərəm/	Small dark region in the NW quadrant, E of Pentas	"desert of wings", associated with Mercury in his role as swift messenger
Solitudo Aphrodites	/ˌsɒlɪˈtjuːdoʊ ˌæfrəˈdaɪtiːz/	Dark region in the NW quadrant, between 30° and 60° N	"desert of Aphrodite"
Solitudo Argiphontae	/ˌsɒlɪˈtjuːdoʊ ˌɑːrdʒɪˈfɒntiː/	Dark region in the NW quadrant, extending along the terminator from the Equator to about 60° N	"desert of Argiphontes"; Argiphontes means "slayer of Argus Panoptes" and is an epithet for Hermes
Solitudo Atlantis	/ˌsɒlɪˈtjuːdoʊ ætˈlæntɪs/	Dark region in the SW quadrant, between 20° and 50° S	"desert of Atlas"
Solitudo Criophori	/ˌsɒlɪˈtjuːdoʊ kraɪˈɒfəraɪ/	Dark region mostly in the NW quadrant, near the Equator, extending from about 20° N to the western terminator near the Equator	"desert of Criophorus"; Criophorus means "bearer of the ram" and is an epithet for Hermes
Solitudo Dionysi	/ˌsɒlɪˈtjuːdoʊ ˌdaɪəˈnaɪsaɪ/	Dark region in the NE quadrant, between Caduceata and Liguria, about 40° S	"desert of Dionysus"
Solitudo Hermae Trismegisti	/ˌsɒlɪˈtjuːdoʊ ˈhɜːrmiː ˌtrɪzmɪˈdʒɪstaɪ/	Large medium-albedo region in the SE quadrant, between 30° and 60° S	"desert of Thrice-greatest Hermes"
Solitudo Iovis	/ˌsɒlɪˈtjuːdoʊ ˈdʒoʊvɪs/	Dark region in the SE quadrant, centered about 25° S, 20° E	"desert of Jupiter"
Solitudo Ius	/ˌsɒlɪˈtjuːdoʊ ˈaɪəs/	Dark patch SE of Solitudo Atlantis, in SW quadrant about 50° S	"desert of Io"
Solitudo Lycaonis	/ˌsɒlɪˈtjuːdoʊ lɪˈkeɪənɪs/	Dark patch near the eastern terminator, centered slightly north of the Equator	"desert of Lycaon"
Solitudo Lyrae	/ˌsɒlɪˈtjuːdoʊ ˈlaɪriː/	Small dark patch in the SE quadrant, just south of the Equator, adjoining Neptuni Vallis	"desert of the lyre", an instrument associated with Hermes
Solitudo Maiae	/ˌsɒlɪˈtjuːdoʊ ˈmeɪiː/	Dark region in the SW quadrant, NE of Cyllene	"desert of Maia" (the mother of Hermes)
Solitudo Martis	/ˌsɒlɪˈtjuːdoʊ ˈmɑːrtɪs/	Dark region in the SE quadrant, about 30°S, 60° E	"desert of Mars"
Solitudo Panos	/ˌsɒlɪˈtjuːdoʊ ˈpeɪnɒs/	Dark region in the southern hemisphere, along the zero meridian between 30° and 50° S	"desert of Pan"
Solitudo Persephones	/ˌsɒlɪˈtjuːdoʊ pərˈsɛfəniːz/	Dark region in the SW quadrant, above 60° S, near the terminator	"desert of Persephone"
Solitudo Phoenicis	/ˌsɒlɪˈtjuːdoʊ fɪˈnaɪsɪs/	Small dark region on the Equator, between 10° and 30° W	"desert of the phoenix"
Solitudo Promethei	/ˌsɒlɪˈtjuːdoʊ proʊˈmiːθiːaɪ/	Dark region in the SE quadrant, about 70° S, near the eastern terminator	"desert of Prometheus"

The names of albedo features currently used by the Gazetteer of Planetary Nomenclature are largely based upon Antoniadi's names, but include several alterations; they also necessarily use a different coordinate grid.

The newer regional names are: Borea (/ˈbɔːriə/) "Northern region"; Australia (/ɔːˈstreɪliə/) "Southern region"; and Tricrena (/trɪˈkriːnə/), the name of a mountain near Pheneus in Arcadia.

Other changes are: all features named Vallis and Promontorium have been renamed Solitudo; Solitudo Argiphontae has been renamed Sinus Argiphontae ("bay of Argiphontes"); Admeti has been changed to Admetei (in error; there is no mythological figure Admeteus); Pleias has become Pleias Gallia.
