= Mariner 10 =

First spacecraft to visit Mercury (1973–1975)

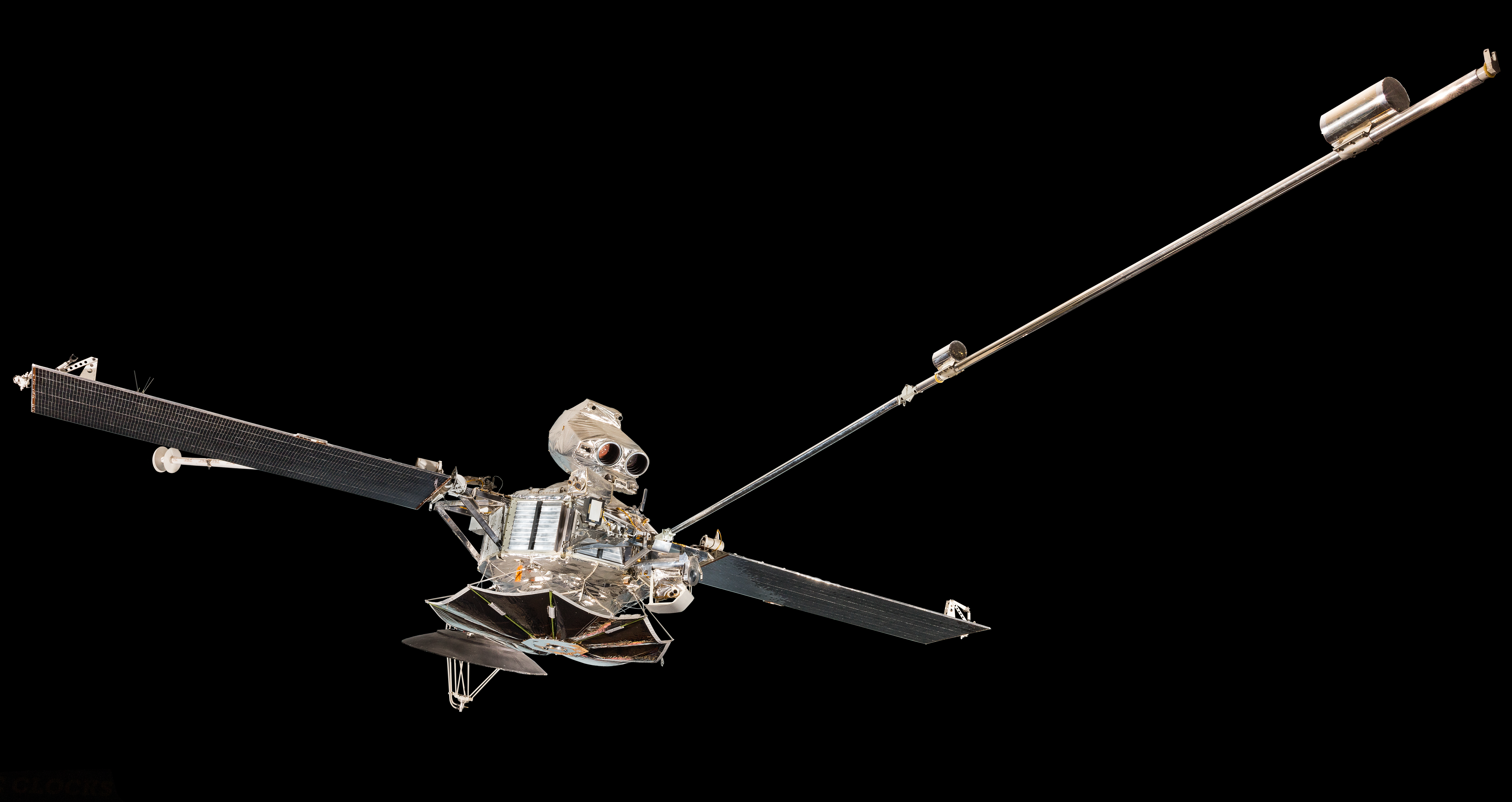
- Mariner 10 flight spare
- Mission type: Planetary exploration
- Operator: NASA / JPL
- COSPAR ID: 1973-085A
- SATCAT no.: 6919
- Mission duration: 1 year, 4 months and 21 days

Spacecraft properties
- Spacecraft: Mariner-J
- Manufacturer: Jet Propulsion Laboratory
- Launch mass: 502.9 kilograms (1,109 lb)
- Power: 820 watts (at Venus encounter)

Start of mission
- Launch date: 3 November 1973, 05:45:00 UTC
- Rocket: Atlas SLV-3D Centaur-D1A
- Launch site: Cape Canaveral, LC-36B

End of mission
- Disposal: Decommissioned
- Deactivated: 24 March 1975 12:21 UTC

Flyby of Venus
- Closest approach: 5 February 1974
- Distance: 5,768 kilometers (3,584 mi)

Flyby of Mercury
- Closest approach: 29 March 1974
- Distance: 704 kilometers (437 mi)

Flyby of Mercury
- Closest approach: 21 September 1974
- Distance: 48,069 kilometers (29,869 mi)

Flyby of Mercury
- Closest approach: 16 March 1975
- Distance: 327 kilometers (203 mi)

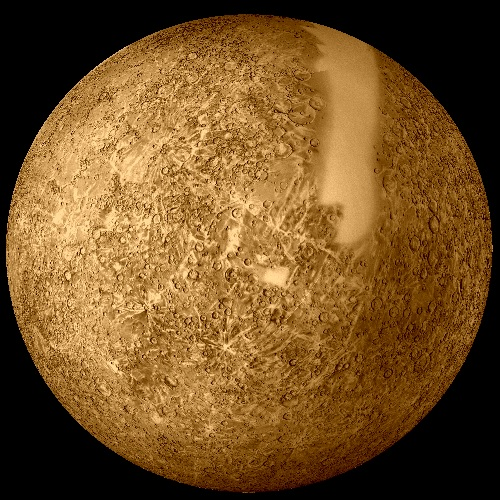
Reprocessed Mariner 10 data was used to produce this image of Mercury. The smooth band is an area of which no images were taken.

Mariner 10 was an American robotic space probe launched by NASA on 3 November 1973, to fly by the planets Mercury and Venus. It was the first spacecraft to visit Mercury and the first to perform a flyby of multiple planets.

Mariner 10 was launched approximately two years after Mariner 9 and was the last spacecraft in the Mariner program. (Mariner 11 and Mariner 12 were allocated to the Voyager program and redesignated Voyager 1 and Voyager 2.)

The mission objectives were to measure Mercury's environment, atmosphere, surface, and body characteristics and to make similar investigations of Venus. Secondary objectives were to perform experiments in the interplanetary medium and to obtain experience with a dual-planet gravity assist mission. Mariner 10's science team was led by Bruce C. Murray at the Jet Propulsion Laboratory.

== Design and trajectory ==
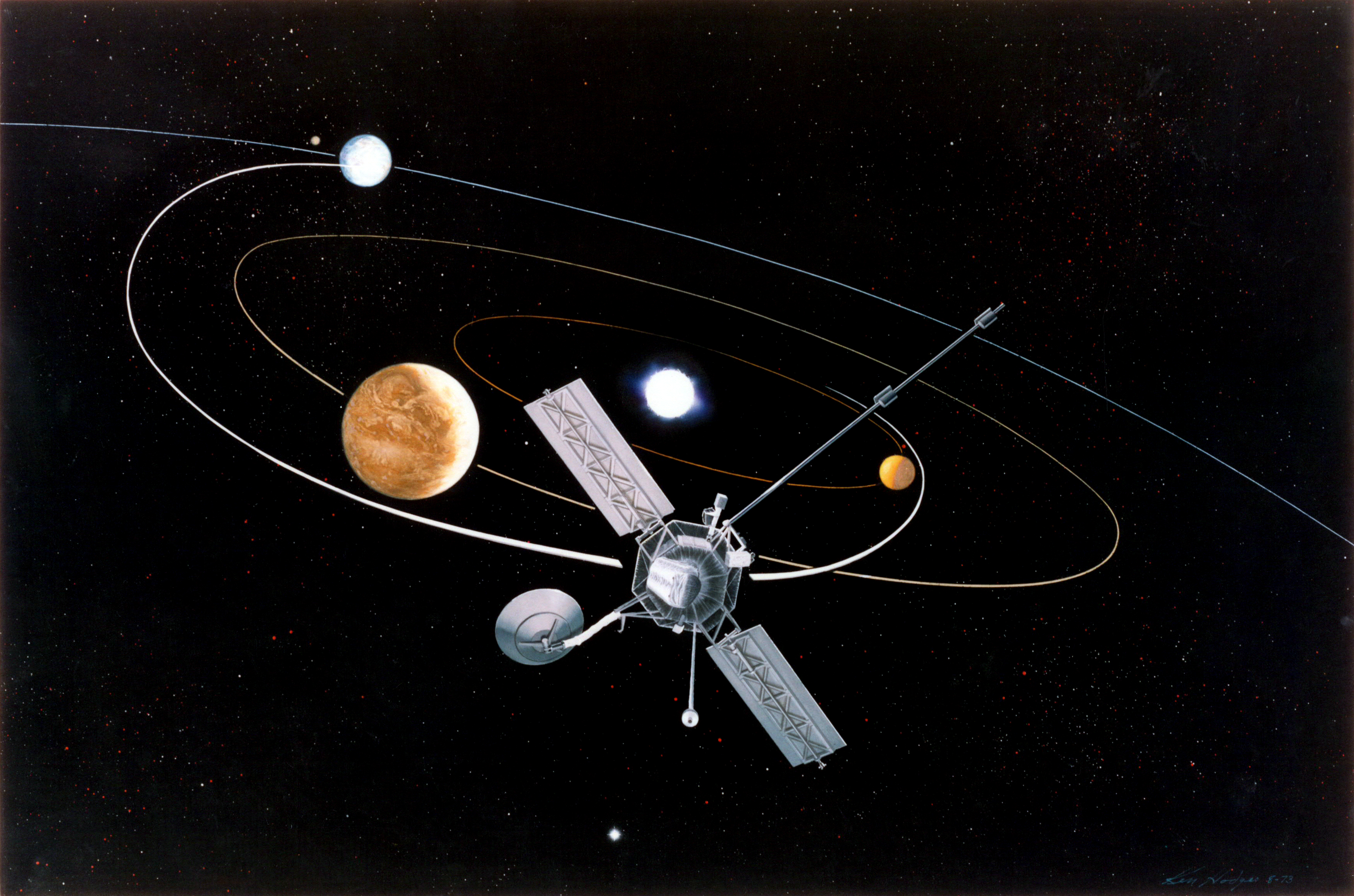
An artists' impression of the Mariner 10 mission. It used a flyby of the planet Venus to decrease its perihelion. This would allow the spacecraft to meet Mercury on three occasions in 1974 and 1975.

Mariner 10 was the first mission to use a gravity assist from one planet (in this case, Venus) to reach another planet. (Note: Luna-3 was the first spacecraft to use Gravity assist.) It used Venus to bend its flight path and bring its perihelion down to the level of Mercury's orbit. This maneuver, inspired by the orbital mechanics calculations of the Italian scientist Giuseppe Colombo, put the spacecraft into an orbit that repeatedly brought it back to Mercury. Mariner 10 used the solar radiation pressure on its solar panels and its high-gain antenna as a means of attitude control during flight, the first spacecraft to use active solar pressure control.

The components on Mariner 10 can be categorized into four groups based on their common function. The solar panels, power subsystem, attitude control subsystem, and the computer kept the spacecraft operating properly during the flight. The navigational system, including the hydrazine rocket, would keep Mariner 10 on track to Venus and Mercury. Several scientific instruments would collect data at the two planets. Finally, the antennas would transmit this data to the Deep Space Network back on Earth, as well as receive commands from Mission Control. Mariner 10's various components and scientific instruments were attached to a central hub, which was roughly the shape of an octagonal prism. The hub stored the spacecraft's internal electronics. The Mariner 10 spacecraft was manufactured by Boeing. NASA set a strict limit of US$98 million for Mariner 10's total cost, which marked the first time the agency subjected a mission to an inflexible budget constraint. No overruns would be tolerated, so mission planners carefully considered cost efficiency when designing the spacecraft's instruments. Cost control was primarily accomplished by executing contract work closer to the launch date than was recommended by normal mission schedules, as reducing the length of available work time increased cost efficiency. Despite the rushed schedule, very few deadlines were missed. The mission ended up about US$1 million under budget.

Attitude control is needed to keep a spacecraft's instruments and antennas aimed in the correct direction. During course correction maneuvers, the spacecraft may need to rotate so that its rocket engine faces the proper direction before being fired. Mariner 10 determined its attitude using two optical sensors, one pointed at the Sun, and the other at a bright star, usually Canopus; additionally, the probe's three gyroscopes provided a second option for calculating the attitude. Nitrogen gas thrusters were used to adjust Mariner 10's orientation along three axes. The spacecraft's electronics were intricate and complex: it contained over 32,000 pieces of circuitry, of which resistors, capacitors, diodes, microcircuits, and transistors were the most common devices. Commands for the instruments could be stored on Mariner 10's computer, but were limited to 512 words. The rest had to be broadcast by the Mission Sequence Working Group from Earth. Supplying the spacecraft components with power required modifying the electrical output of the solar panels. The power subsystem used two redundant sets of circuitry, each containing a booster regulator and an inverter, to convert the panels' DC output to AC and alter the voltage to the necessary level. The subsystem could store up to 20 ampere hours of electricity on a 39-volt nickel–cadmium battery.

The flyby past Mercury posed major technical challenges for scientists to overcome. Due to Mercury's proximity to the Sun, Mariner 10 would have to endure 4.5 times more solar radiation than when it departed Earth; compared to previous Mariner missions, spacecraft parts needed extra shielding against the heat. Thermal blankets and a sunshade were installed on the main body. After evaluating different choices for the sunshade cloth material, mission planners chose beta cloth, a combination of aluminized Kapton and glass-fiber sheets treated with Teflon. However, solar shielding was unfeasible for some of Mariner 10's other components. Mariner 10's two solar panels needed to be kept under 115 °C (239 °F). Covering the panels would defeat their purpose of producing electricity. The solution was to add an adjustable tilt to the panels, so the angle at which they faced the sun could be changed. Engineers considered folding the panels toward each other, making a V-shape with the main body, but tests found this approach had the potential to overheat the rest of the spacecraft. The alternative chosen was to mount the solar panels in a line and tilt them along that axis, which had the added benefit of increasing the efficiency of the spacecraft's nitrogen jet thrusters, which could now be placed on the panel tips. The panels could be rotated a maximum of 76°. Additionally, Mariner 10's hydrazine rocket nozzle had to face the Sun to function properly, but scientists rejected covering the nozzle with a thermal door as an undependable solution. Instead, a special paint was applied to exposed parts on the rocket so as to reduce heat flow from the nozzle to the delicate instruments on the spacecraft.

Accurately performing the gravity assist at Venus posed another hurdle. If Mariner 10 was to maintain a course to Mercury, its trajectory could deviate no more than 200 kilometers (120 mi) from a critical point in the vicinity of Venus. To ensure that the necessary course corrections could be made, mission planners tripled the amount of hydrazine fuel Mariner 10 would carry, and also equipped the spacecraft with more nitrogen gas for the thrusters than the previous Mariner mission had held. These upgrades proved crucial in enabling the second and third Mercury flybys.

The mission still lacked the ultimate safeguard: a sister spacecraft. It was common for probes to be launched in pairs, with complete redundancy to guard against the failure of one or the other. The budget constraint ruled this option out. Even though mission planners stayed sufficiently under budget to divert some funding for constructing a backup spacecraft, the budget did not permit both to be launched at the same time. In the event that Mariner 10 failed, NASA would only allow the backup to be launched if the fatal error was diagnosed and fixed; this would have to be completed in the two and a half weeks between the scheduled launch on 3 November 1973 and the last possible launch date of 21 November 1973. The unused backup was sent to the Smithsonian museum for display.

== Instruments ==
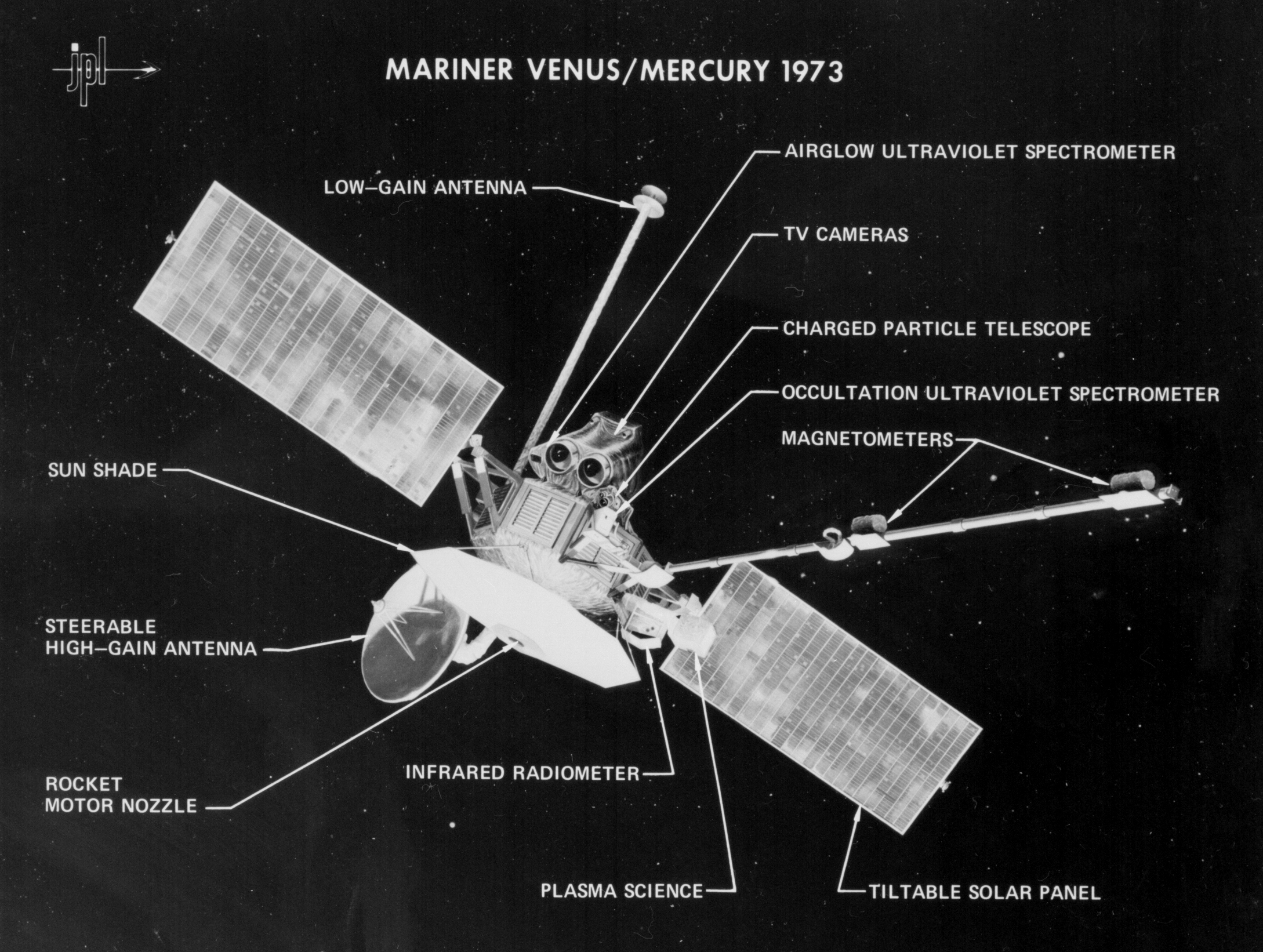
An illustration showing the instruments of Mariner 10

Mariner 10 conducted seven experiments at Venus and Mercury. Six of these experiments had a dedicated scientific instrument to collect data. The experiments and instruments were designed by research laboratories and educational institutions from across the United States. Out of forty-six submissions, JPL selected seven experiments on the basis of maximizing science return without exceeding cost guidelines: together, the seven scientific experiments cost US12.6 million dollars, about one-eighth of the total mission budget.

=== Television photography ===
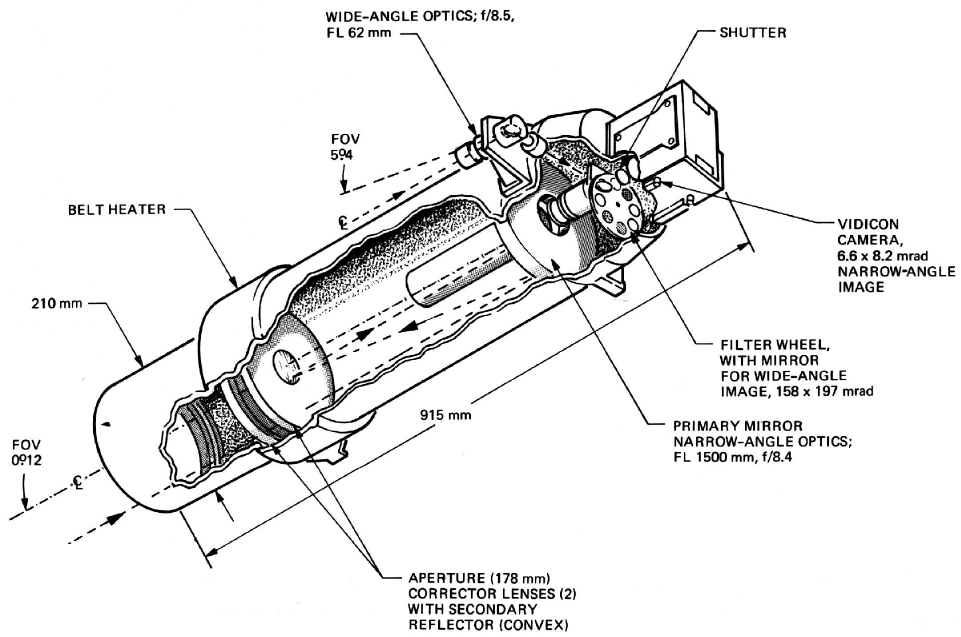
Cutaway view of one Mariner 10 television camera

The imaging system, the Television Photography Experiment, consisted of two 15 centimeters (5.9 in) Cassegrain telescopes feeding vidicon tubes. The main telescope could be bypassed to a smaller wide angle optic, but using the same tube. It had an 8-position filter wheel, with one position occupied by a mirror for the wide-angle bypass.

TV camera exposures ranged from 3 ms to 12 s with each camera being able to take a picture every 42 s. The picture resolution was 832×700 pixels (0.6 MP), 8-bit coded.

Mariner 10 Television Photography Experiment filters
Name	Wavelength		
Name	Range	Spectrum	Peak
1 - Wide-angle image relay mirror			
2 – Blue bandpass	410–530 nm		475
3 – UV polarizing	330–390 nm		355
4 – Minus UV high pass	410–630 nm		511
5 – Clear	400–630 nm		487
6 – UV bandpass	330–390 nm		355
7 – Defocusing lens (for calibration)			
8 – Yellow bandpass	540–630 nm		575

The entire imaging system was imperiled when electric heaters attached to the cameras failed to turn on immediately after launch. To avoid the Sun's damaging heat, the cameras were deliberately placed on the spacecraft side facing away from the Sun. Consequently, the heaters were needed to prevent the cameras from losing heat and become so cold that they would become damaged. JPL engineers found that the vidicons could generate enough heat through normal operation to stay just above the critical temperature of −40 °C (−40 °F); therefore they advised against turning off the cameras during the flight. Test photos of the Earth and Moon showed that image quality had not been significantly affected. The mission team was pleasantly surprised when the camera heaters started working on 17 January 1974, two months after launch. Later investigation concluded that a short circuit in a different location on the probe had prevented the heater from turning on. This allowed the vidicons to be turned off as needed.

Of the six main scientific instruments, the 43.6 kilograms (96 lb) cameras were by far the most massive device. Requiring 67 watts of electricity, the cameras consumed more power than the other five instruments combined. The system returned about 7,000 photographs of Mercury and Venus during Mariner 10's flybys.

=== Infrared radiometer ===
The infrared radiometer detected infrared radiation given off by the surface of Mercury and the atmosphere of Venus, from which the temperature could be calculated. How quickly the surface lost heat as it rotated into the planet's dark side revealed aspects about the composition of the surface, such as whether it was made out of rocks, or out of finer particles. The infrared radiometer contained a pair of Cassegrain telescopes fixed at an angle of 120° to each other and a pair of detectors made from antimony-bismuth thermopiles. The instrument was designed to measure temperatures as cold as −193 °C (−315.4 °F) and as hot as 427 °C (801 °F). Stillman C. Chase, Jr. of the Santa Barbara Research Center headed the infrared radiometer experiment.

=== Ultraviolet spectrometers ===
Two ultraviolet spectrometers were involved in this experiment, one to measure UV absorption, the other to sense UV emissions. The occultation spectrometer scanned Mercury's edge as it passed in front of the Sun, and detected whether solar ultraviolet radiation was absorbed in certain wavelengths, which would indicate the presence of gas particles, and therefore an atmosphere. The airglow spectrometer detected extreme ultraviolet radiation emanating from atoms of gaseous hydrogen, helium, carbon, oxygen, neon, and argon. Unlike the occultation spectrometer, it did not require backlighting from the Sun and could move along with the rotatable scan platform on the spacecraft. The experiment's most important goal was to ascertain whether Mercury had an atmosphere, but would also gather data at Earth and Venus and study the interstellar background radiation.

=== Plasma detectors ===
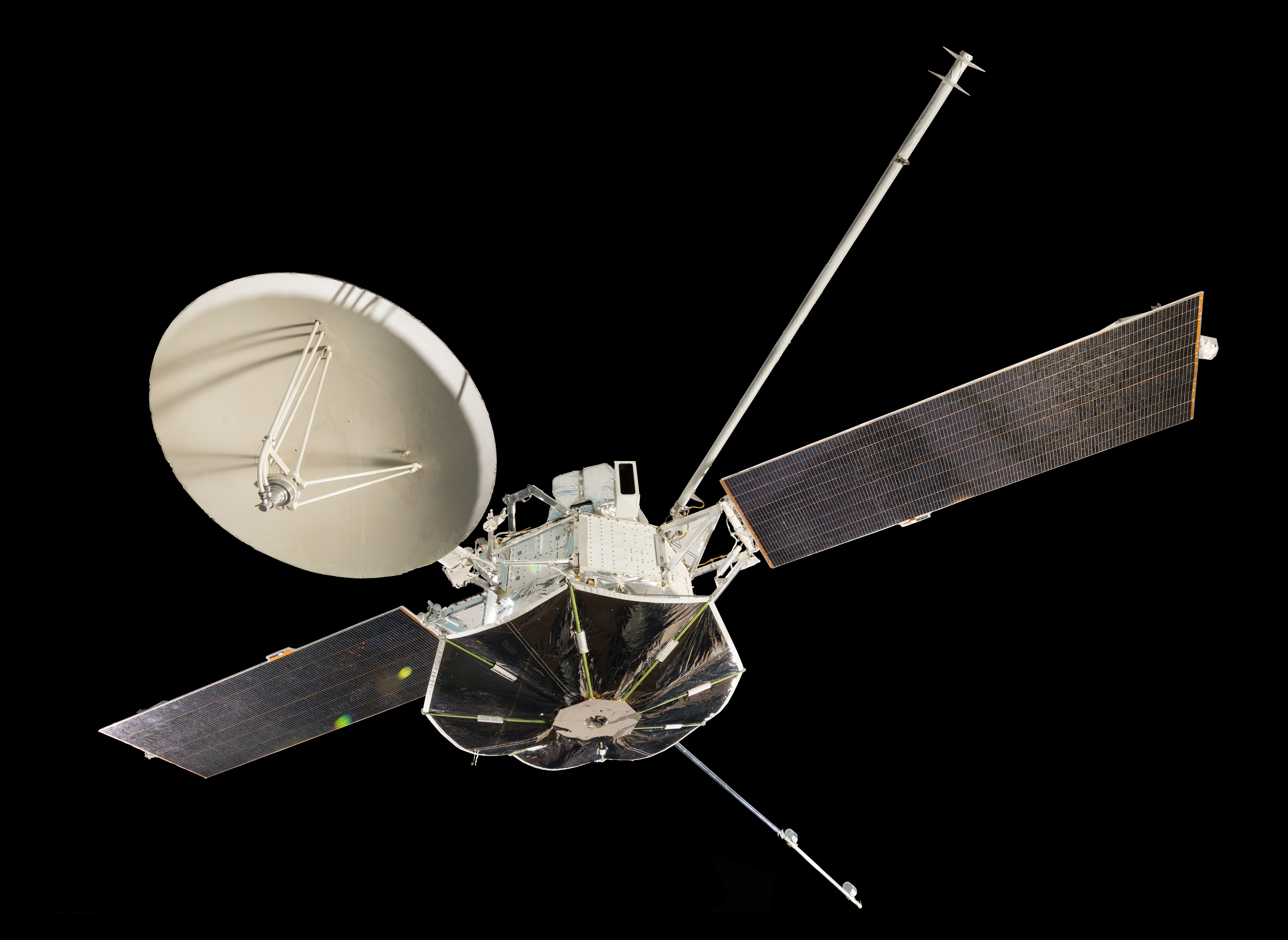
Mariner 10 flight spare

The plasma experiment's goal was to study the ionized gases (plasma) of the solar wind, the temperature and density of its electrons, and how the planets affected the velocity of the plasma stream. The experiment contained two components, facing in opposite directions. The Scanning Electrostatic Analyzer was aimed toward the Sun and could detect positive ions and electrons, which were separated by a set of three concentric hemispherical plates. The Scanning Electron Spectrometer was aimed away from the Sun, and detected only electrons, using just one hemispherical plate. The instruments could be rotated about 60° to either side. By gathering data on the solar wind's movement around Mercury, the plasma experiment could be used to verify the magnetometer's observations of Mercury's magnetic field. Using the plasma detectors, Mariner 10 gathered the first in situ solar wind data from inside Venus's orbit.

Shortly after launch, scientists found that the Scanning Electrostatic Analyzer had failed because a door shielding the analyzer did not open. An unsuccessful attempt was made to forcibly unfasten the door with the first course correction maneuver. The experiment operators had planned to observe the directions taken by positive ions prior to the ions' collision with the Analyzer, but this data was lost. The experiment was still able to collect some data using the properly functioning Scanning Electron Spectrometer.

=== Charged particle telescopes ===
The goal of the charged particles experiment was to observe how the heliosphere interacted with cosmic radiation. In connection with the plasma detectors and magnetometers, this experiment had the potential to provide additional evidence of a magnetic field around Mercury, by showing whether such a field had captured charged particles. Two telescopes were used to collect highly energetic electrons and atomic nuclei, specifically oxygen nuclei or less massive. These particles then passed through a set of detectors and were counted.

=== Magnetometers ===
Two fluxgate magnetometers were entrusted with discerning whether Mercury produced a magnetic field, and studying the interplanetary magnetic field between flybys. In designing this experiment, scientists had to account for interference from the magnetic field generated by Mariner 10's many electronic parts. For this reason, the magnetometers had to be situated on a long boom, one closer to the octagonal hub, the other one further away. Data from the two magnetometers would be cross-referenced to filter out the spacecraft's own magnetic field. Drastically weakening the probe's magnetic field would have increased costs.

=== Celestial Mechanics and Radio Science experiment ===
This experiment investigated the mass and gravitational characteristics of Mercury. It was of particular interest because of the planet's closeness to the Sun, large orbital eccentricity, and unusual spin-orbit resonance.

As the spacecraft passed behind Mercury on the first encounter there was an opportunity to probe the atmosphere and to measure the radius of the planet. By observing phase changes in the S-band radio signal, measurements of the atmosphere could be made. The atmosphere was assessed as having a density of about 10^{16} molecules per cm^{3}.

== Mission profile ==
=== Departing Earth ===
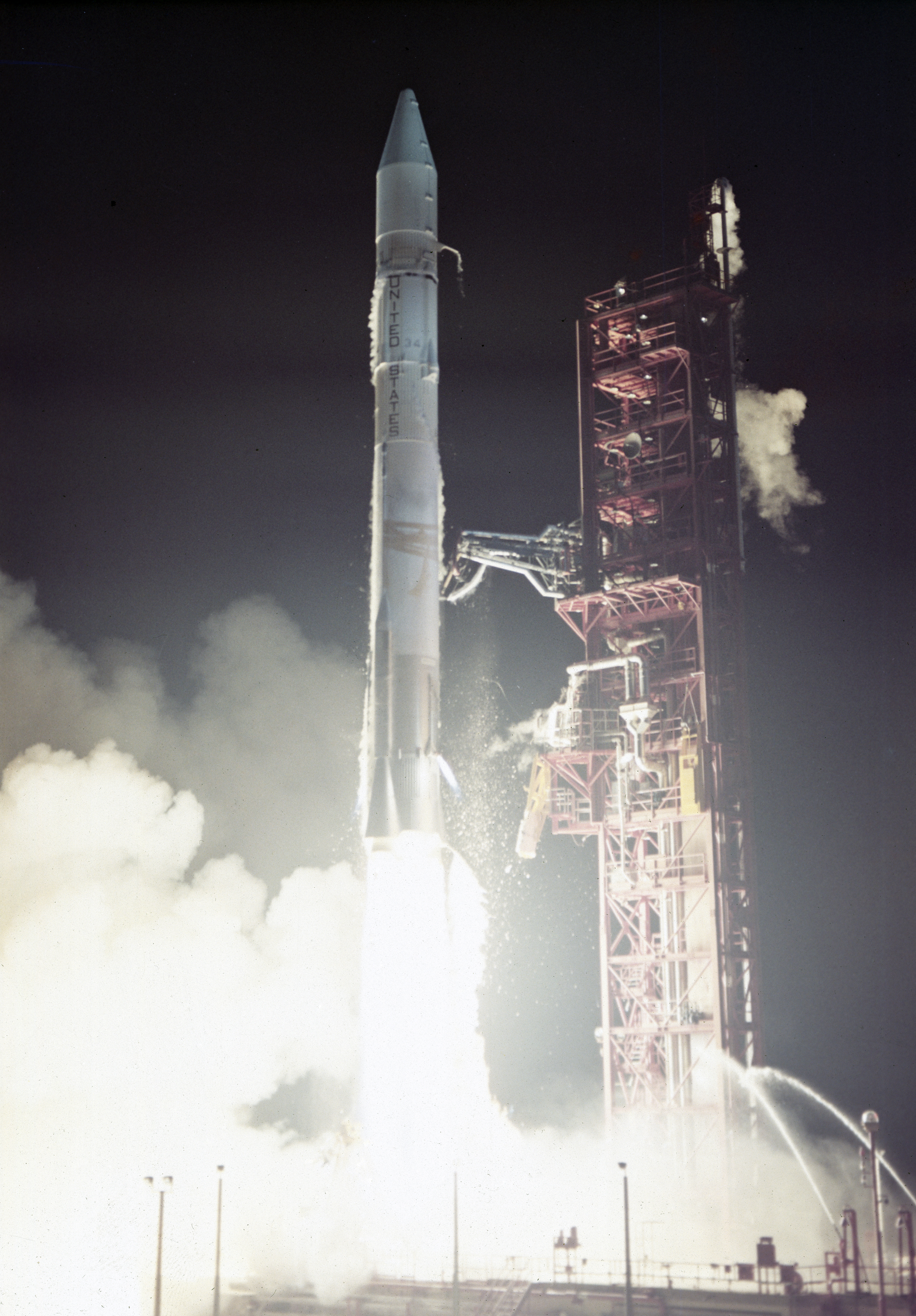
Launch of Mariner 10

Boeing finished building the spacecraft at the end of June 1973, and Mariner 10 was delivered from Seattle to JPL's headquarters in California, where JPL comprehensively tested the integrity of the spacecraft and its instruments. After the tests were finished, the probe was transported to the Eastern Test Range in Florida, the launch site. Technicians filled a tank on the spacecraft with 29 kilograms (64 lb) of hydrazine fuel so that the probe could make course corrections, and attached squibs, whose detonation would signal Mariner 10 to exit the launch rocket and deploy its instruments. The planned gravity assist at Venus made it feasible to use an Atlas-Centaur rocket instead of a more powerful but more expensive Titan IIIC. The probe and the Atlas-Centaur were attached together ten days prior to liftoff. Launch posed one of the largest risks of failure for the Mariner 10 mission; Mariner 1, Mariner 3, and Mariner 8 all failed minutes after lift-off due to either engineering failures or Atlas rocket malfunctions. The mission had a launch period of about a month in length, from 16 October 1973, to 21 November 1973. NASA chose 3 November as the launch date because it would optimize imaging conditions when the spacecraft arrived at Mercury.

On 3 November at 17:45 UTC, the Atlas-Centaur carrying Mariner 10 lifted off from pad SLC-36B. The Atlas stage burned for around four minutes, after which it was jettisoned, and the Centaur stage took over for an additional five minutes, propelling Mariner 10 to a parking orbit. The temporary orbit took the spacecraft one-third of the distance around Earth: this maneuver was needed to reach the correct spot for a second burn by the Centaur engines, which set Mariner 10 on a path towards Venus. The probe then separated from the rocket; subsequently, the Centaur stage diverted away to avoid the possibility of a future collision. Never before had a planetary mission depended upon two separate rocket burns during the launch, and even with Mariner 10, scientists initially viewed the maneuver as too risky.

During its first week of flight, the Mariner 10 camera system was tested by taking five photographic mosaics of the Earth and six of the Moon. It also obtained photographs of the north polar region of the Moon where prior coverage was poor. These photographs provided a basis for cartographers to update lunar maps and improve the lunar control net.

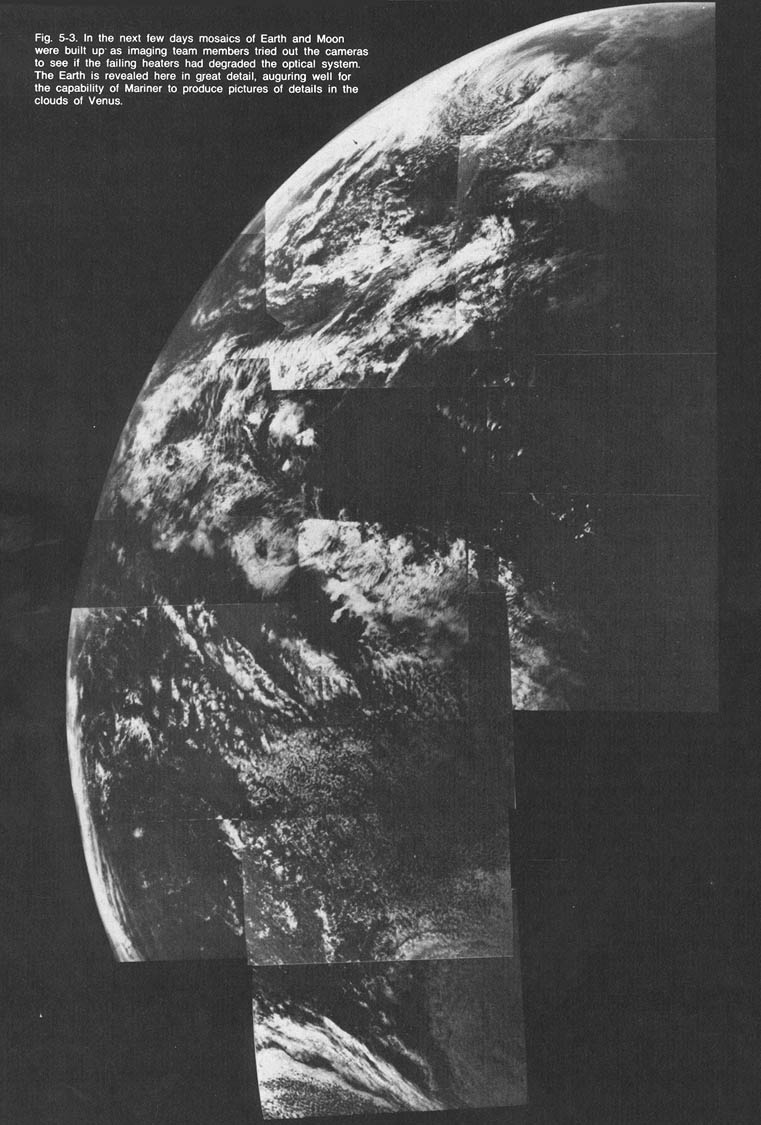
Mosaic of Earth by images taken during Mariner 10 departure from Earth-Moon system.

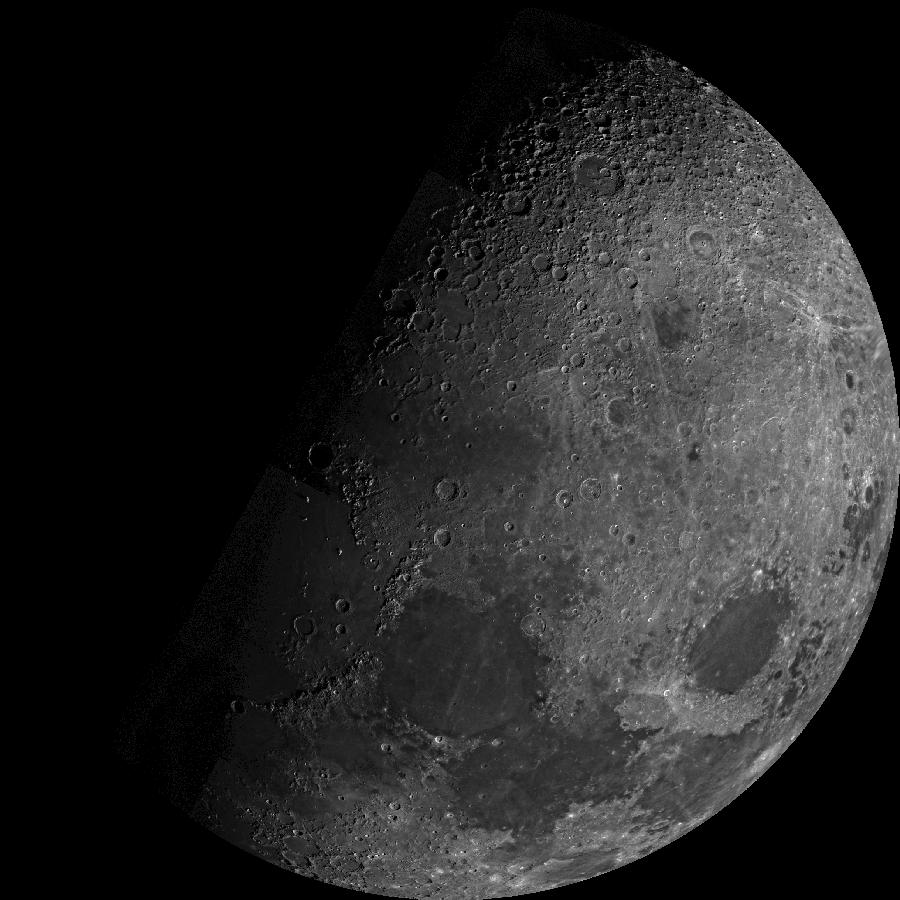
Moon's North Pole - This mosaic is composed of 22 frames acquired in orange (15), clear (4), UV (2), and UV-polarized (1) wavelengths.

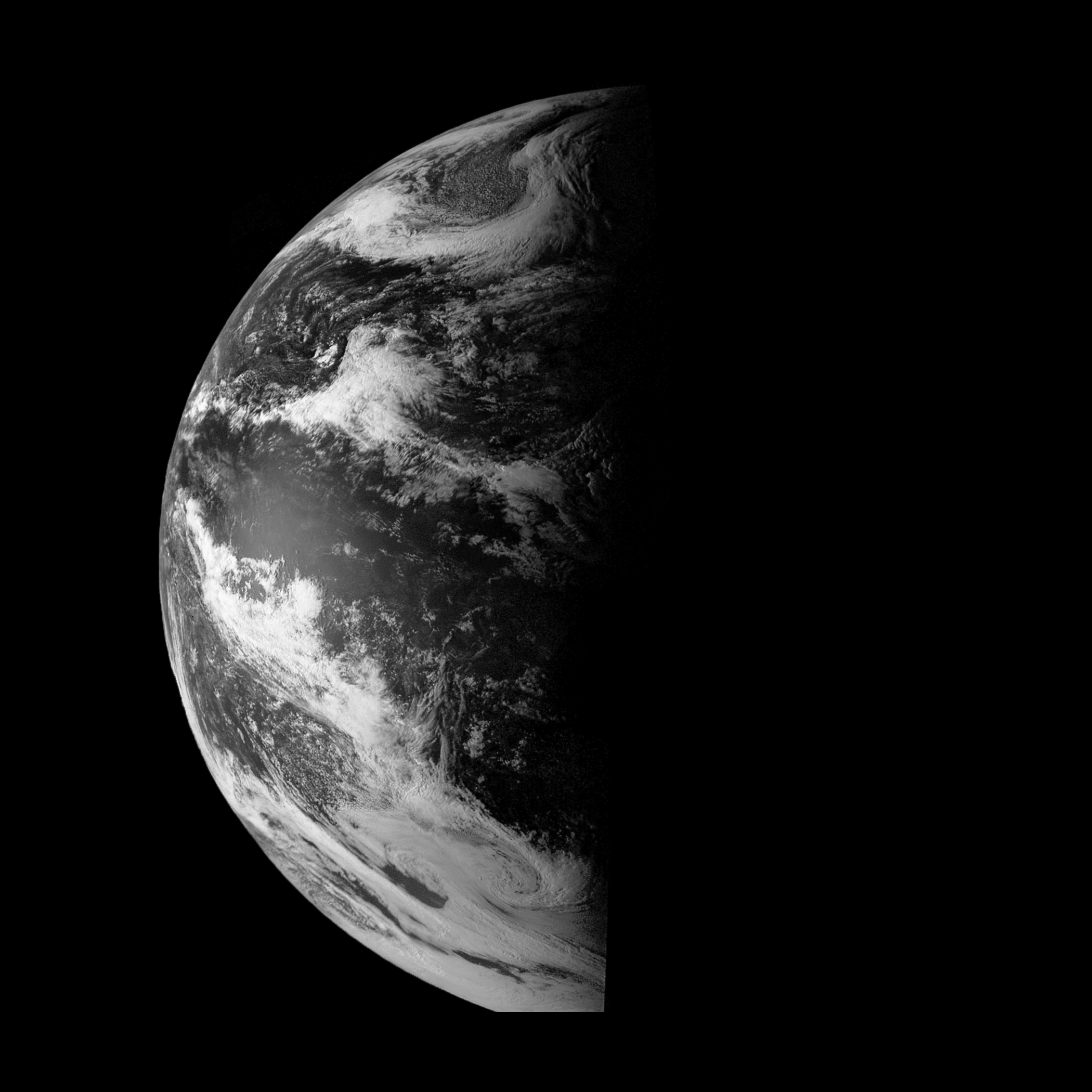
8-frame mosaic of the Earth, acquired on November 5, 1973. Mariner 10 was approximately 200,000 km (120,000 mi) from the Earth.

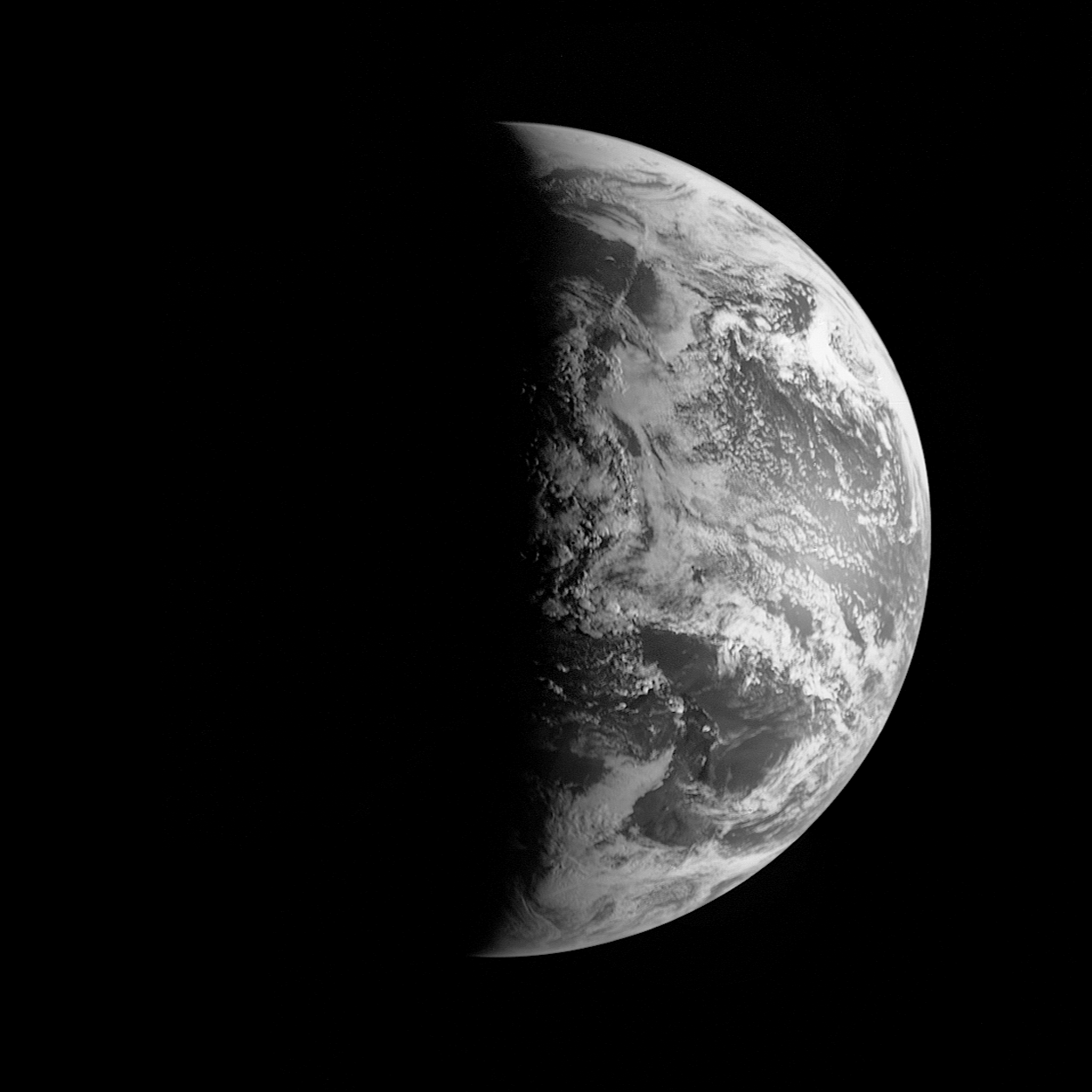
3-frame Mariner 10 mosaic of Earth, taken November 6, 1973 through the spacecraft's Minus UV filter.

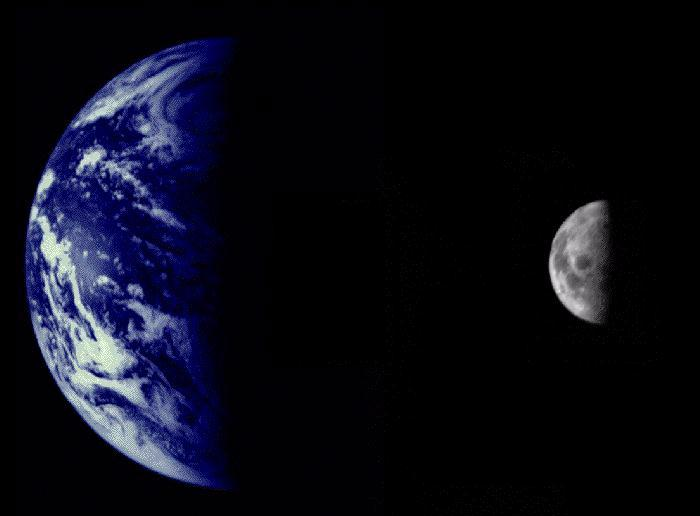
The Earth and Moon from 2.6 million km. These images have been combined at right to illustrate the relative sizes of the two bodies.

=== Cruise to Venus ===
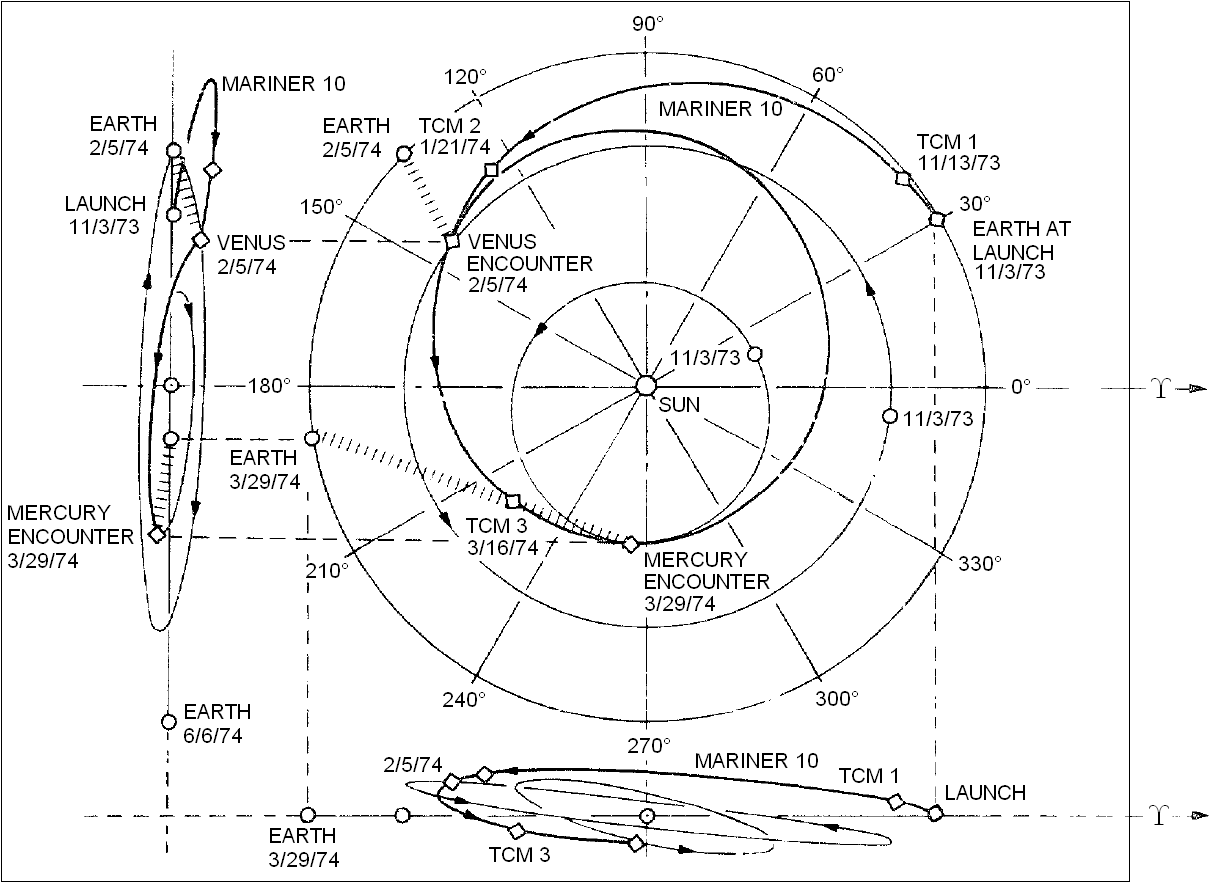
The trajectory of Mariner 10 spacecraft: since launch on 3 November 1973, to first fly-by of Mercury on 29 March 1974.

Far from being an uneventful cruise, Mariner 10's three-month journey to Venus was fraught with technical malfunctions, which kept mission control on edge. Donna Shirley recounted her team's frustration: "It seemed as if we were always just patching Mariner 10 together long enough to get it on to the next phase and next crisis". A trajectory correction maneuver was made on 13 November 1973. Immediately afterward, the star-tracker locked onto a bright flake of paint which had come off the spacecraft and lost tracking on the guide star Canopus. An automated safety protocol recovered Canopus, but the problem of flaking paint recurred throughout the mission. The on-board computer also experienced unscheduled resets occasionally, which necessitated reconfiguring the clock sequence and subsystems. Periodic problems with the high-gain antenna also occurred during the cruise. On 8 January 1974, a malfunction thought to be caused by a short-circuited diode occurred in the power subsystem. As a result, the main booster regulator and inverter failed, leaving the spacecraft dependent on the redundant regulator. Mission planners feared that the same problem could recur in the redundant system and cripple the spacecraft.

In January 1974, Mariner 10 made ultraviolet observations of Comet Kohoutek. Another mid-course correction was made on 21 January 1974.

=== Venus flyby ===
The spacecraft passed Venus on 5 February 1974, the closest approach being 5,768 kilometers (3,584 mi) at 17:01 UTC. It was the twelfth spacecraft to reach Venus and the eighth to return data from the planet, as well as the first mission to succeed in broadcasting images of Venus back to Earth. Mariner 10 built upon observations made by Mariner 5 six years earlier; importantly, Mariner 10 had a camera whereas the prior mission lacked one. As Mariner 10 veered around Venus, from the planet's night side to daylight, the cameras snapped the probe's first image of Venus, showing an illuminated arc of clouds over the north pole emerging from darkness. Engineers initially feared that the star-tracker could mistake the much brighter Venus for Canopus, repeating the mishaps with flaking paint. However, the star-tracker did not malfunction. Earth occultation occurred between 17:07 and 17:11 UTC, during which the spacecraft transmitted X-band radio waves through Venus's atmosphere, gathering data on cloud structure and temperature. Although Venus's cloud cover is nearly featureless in visible light, it was discovered that extensive cloud detail could be seen through Mariner's ultraviolet camera filters. Earth-based ultraviolet observation had shown some indistinct blotching even before Mariner 10, but the detail seen by Mariner was a surprise to most researchers. The probe continued photographing Venus until 13 February 1974 Among the encounter's 4165 acquired photographs, one resulting series of images captured a thick and distinctly patterned atmosphere making a full revolution every four days just as terrestrial observations had suggested.

The mission revealed the composition and meteorological nature of the atmosphere of Venus. Data from the radio science experiment measured the extent to which radio waves passing through the atmosphere were refracted, which was used to calculate the density, pressure, and temperature of the atmosphere at any given altitude. Overall, atmospheric temperature is higher closer to the planet's surface, but Mariner 10 found four altitudes where the pattern was reversed, which could signify the presence of a layer of clouds. The inversions occurred at the 56, 61, 63, and 81 km (35, 38, 39, and 50 mi) levels, confirming previous observations made by the Mariner 5 encounter. The ultraviolet spectrometers identified the chemical substances that comprise Venus's atmosphere. The elevated concentration of atomic oxygen in the upper atmosphere showed that the atmosphere is stratified into upper and lower layers that do not mix with each other; photographs of the upper and lower cloud layers corroborated this hypothesis. Mariner 10's ultraviolet photographs were an invaluable information source for studying the churning clouds of Venus's atmosphere. The mission researchers believed the cloud features they photographed were located in the stratosphere and upper troposphere, created by condensation; they also concluded that the contrast between darker and lighter features was due to differences in the cloud's absorptivity of UV light. The subsolar region was of particular interest: as the sun is straight overhead, it imparts more solar energy to this area than other part of the planet. Compared to the rest of the planet's atmosphere, the subsolar region was highly active and irregular. "Cells" of air lifted by convection, each up to 500 kilometers (310 mi) wide, were observed forming and dissipating within the span of a few hours; some had polygonal outlines.

The gravity assist was also a success, coming well within the acceptable margin for error. In the four hours between 16:00 and 20:00 UTC on 5 February 1974, Mariner 10's heliocentric velocity dropped from 37.008 km/s (82,785 mph) to 32.283 km/s (72,215 mph). This changed the shape of the spacecraft's elliptical orbit around the Sun, so that the perihelion now coincided with the orbit of Mercury.

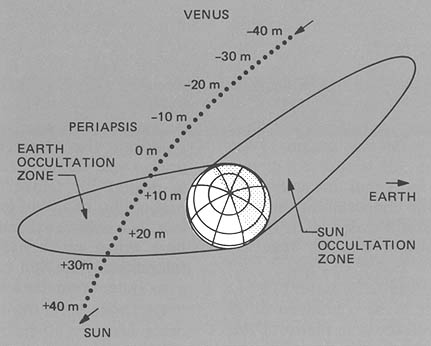
Venus encounter

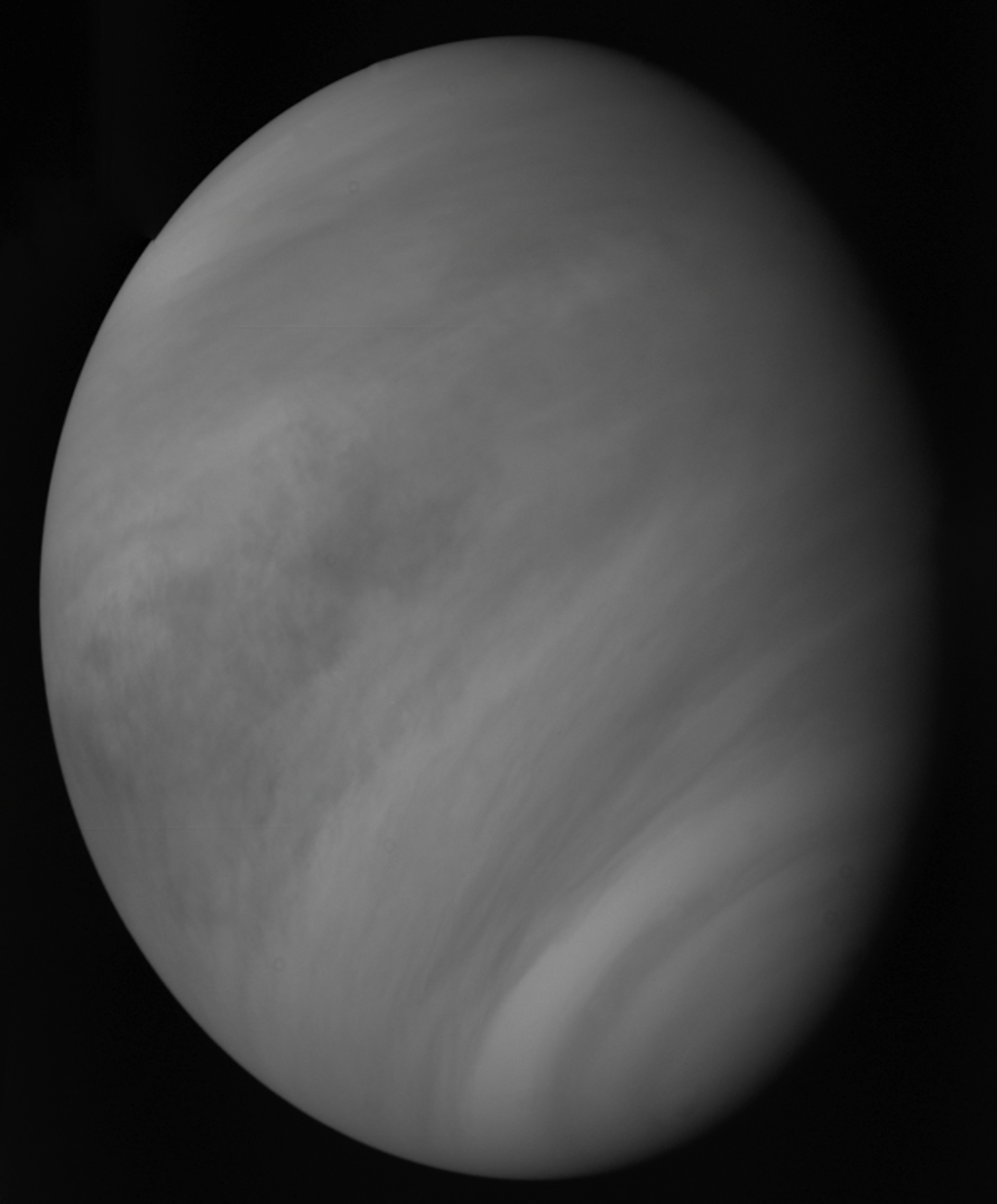
Venus in UV light. This image is a mosaic of two frames.

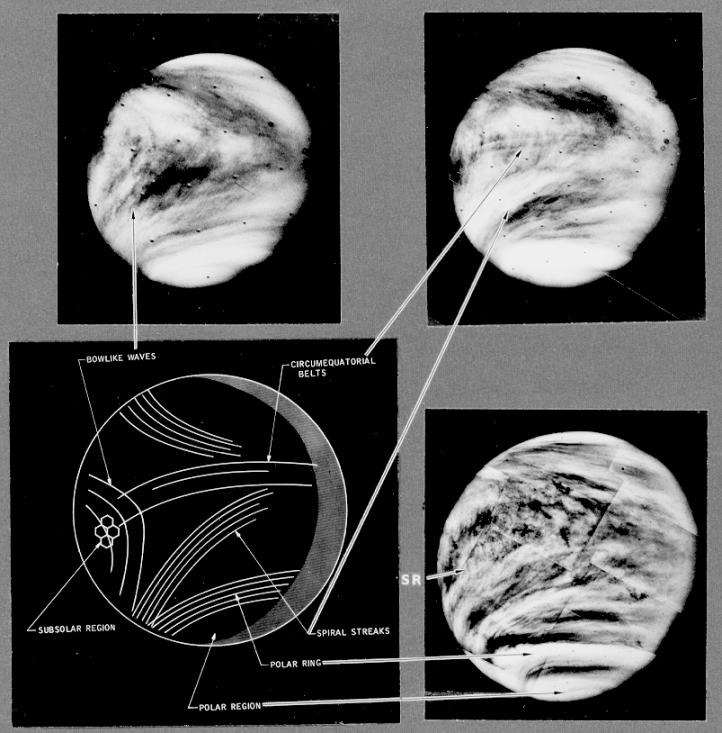
Venus cloud patterns

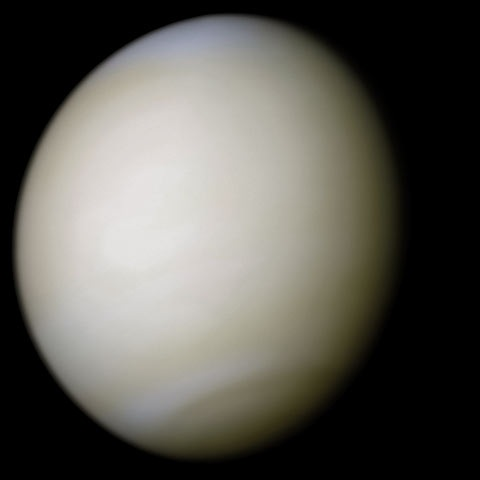
Venus in real colors, processed from clear and blue filtered images

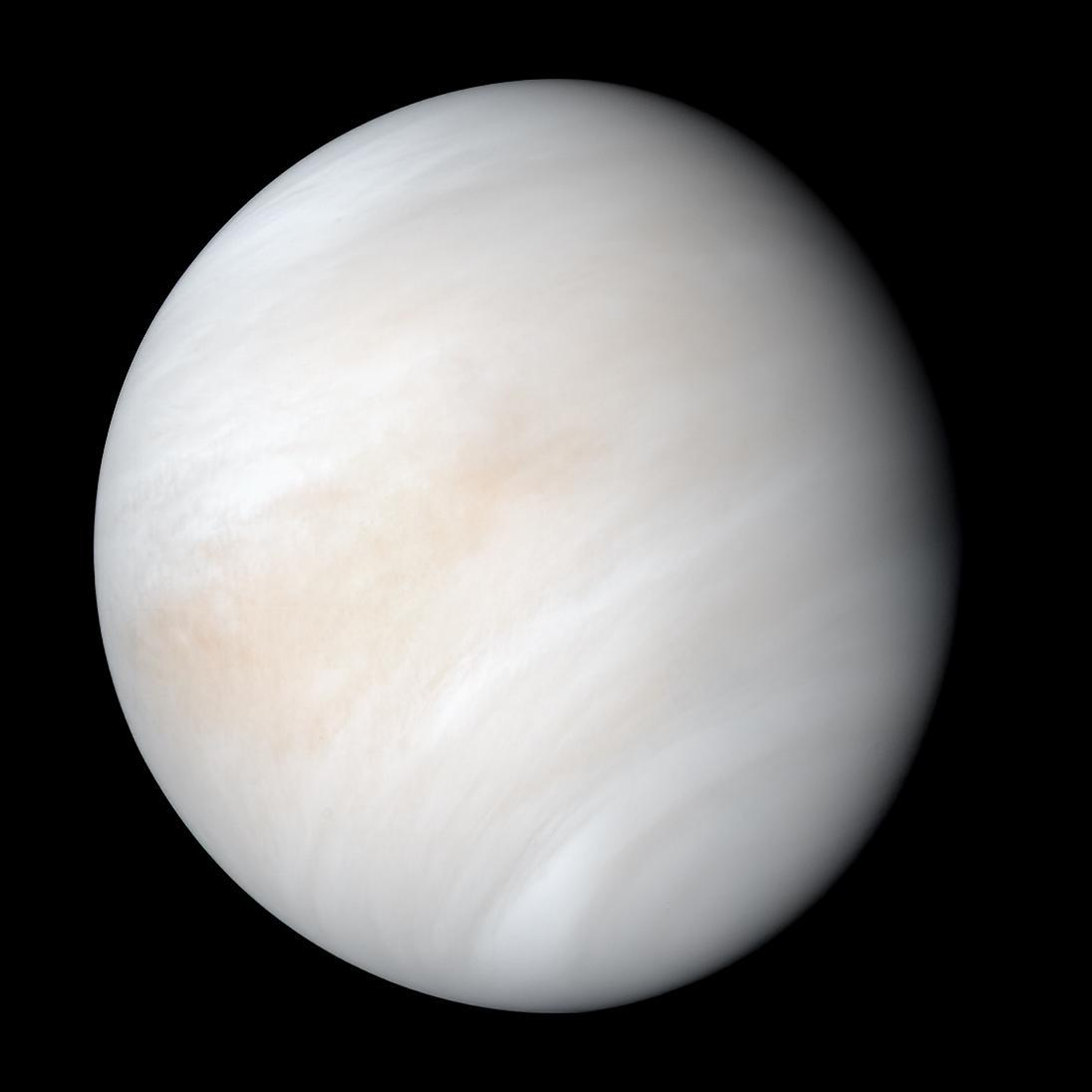
Color composite using orange and ultraviolet filters with modern image processing software

=== First Mercury flyby ===
The spacecraft flew past Mercury three times. The first Mercury encounter took place at 20:47 UTC on 29 March 1974, at a range of 703 kilometers (437 mi), passing on the shadow side.

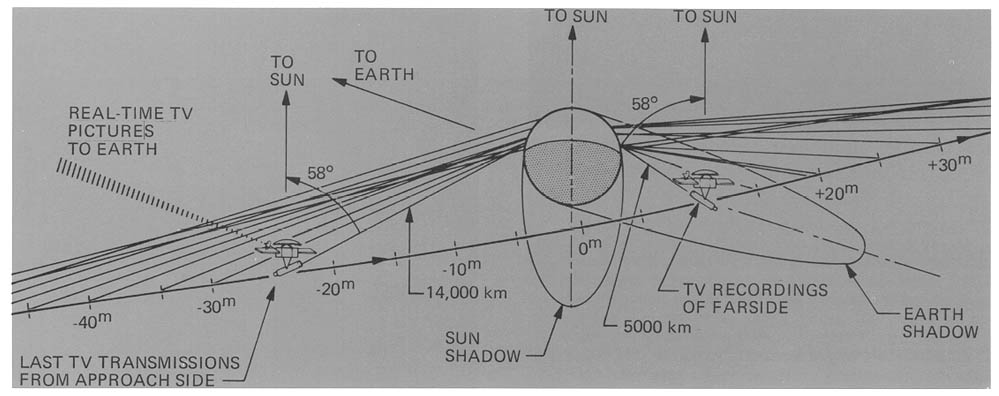
First Mercury encounter

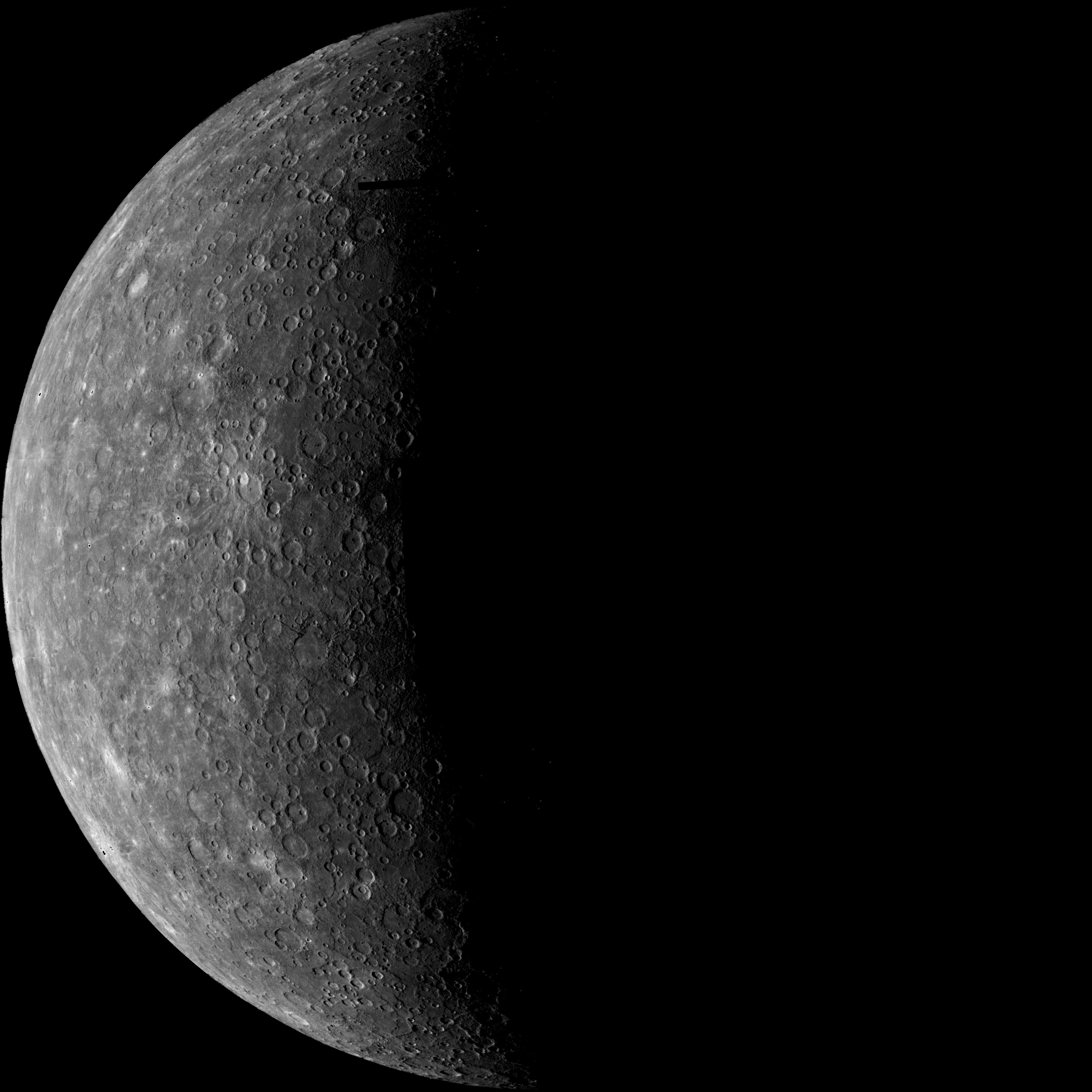
Mariner 10's first image of Mercury acquired on March 24, 1974.

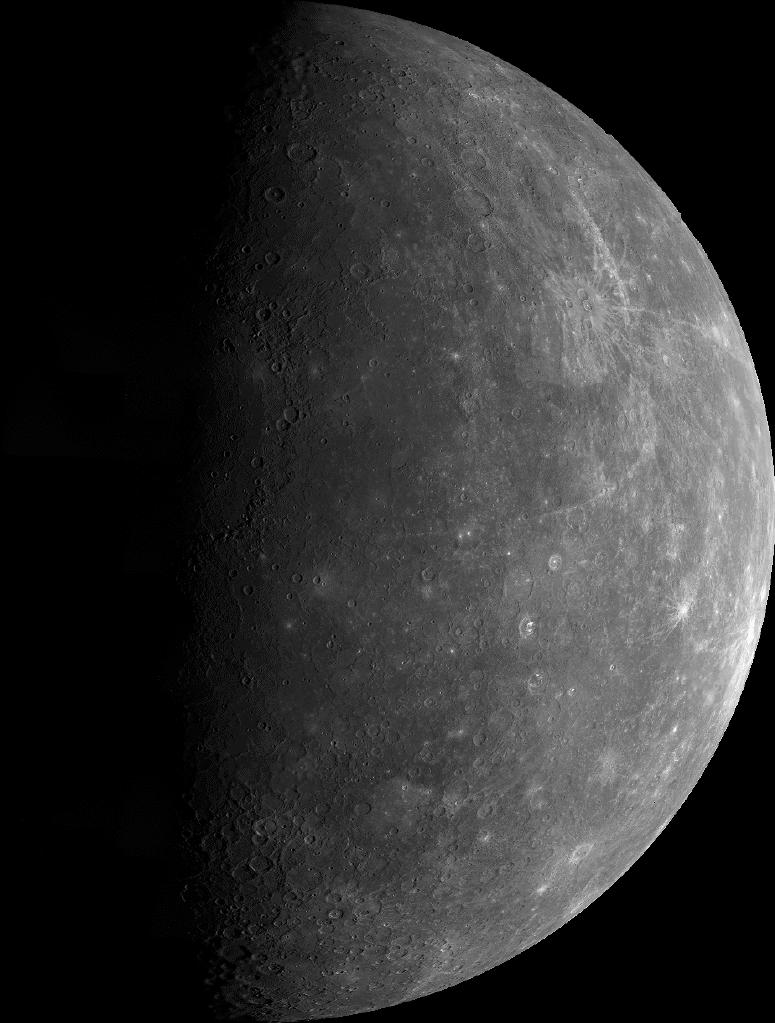
This mosaic shows the planet Mercury as seen by Mariner 10 as it sped away from the planet on March 29, 1974.

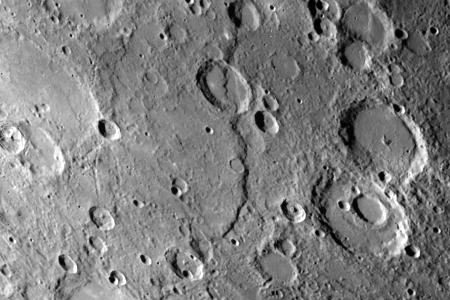
One of the most prominent lobate scarps (Discovery Scarp), photographed by Mariner 10 during its first encounter with Mercury.

=== Second Mercury flyby ===
After looping once around the Sun while Mercury completed two orbits, Mariner 10 flew by Mercury again on 21 September 1974, at a more distant range of 48,069 kilometers (29,869 mi) below the southern hemisphere.

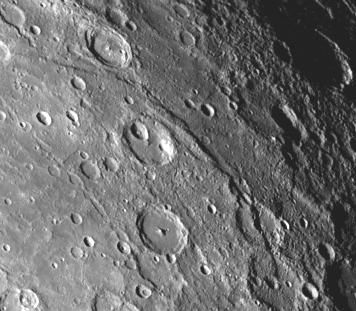
Hero Rupes is a long arcuate lobate scarp visible on this image. Mariner 10 image 0166842.

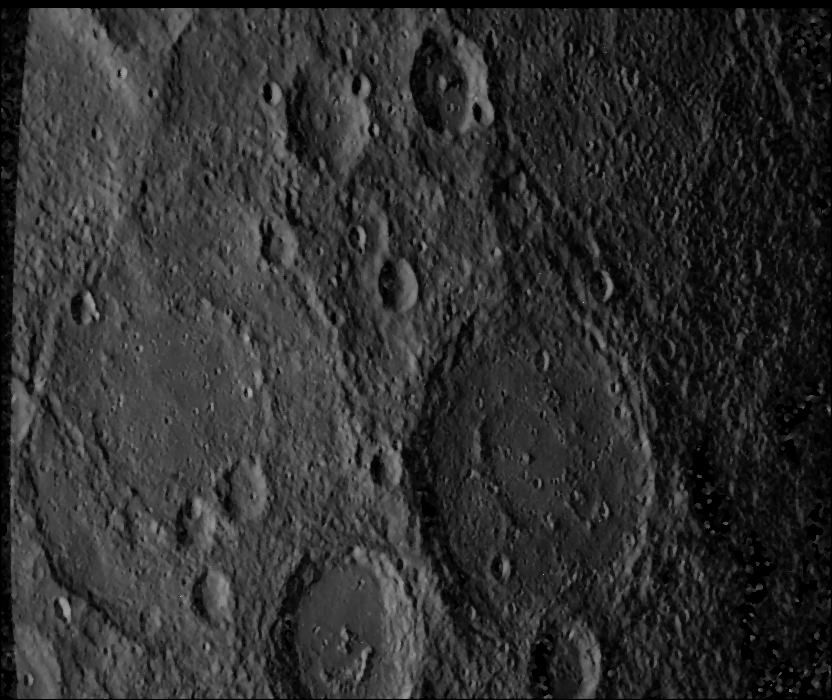
Cervantes basin at left, Bernini at right, and Van Gogh at bottom center. South is to upper right.

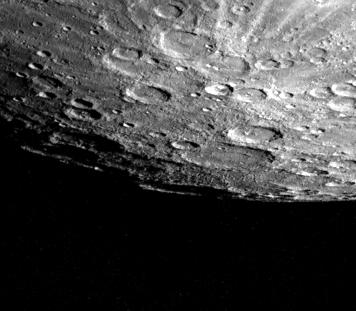
Mercury's south pole was photographed by one of Mariner 10's TV cameras as the spacecraft made its second close flyby of the planet September 21.

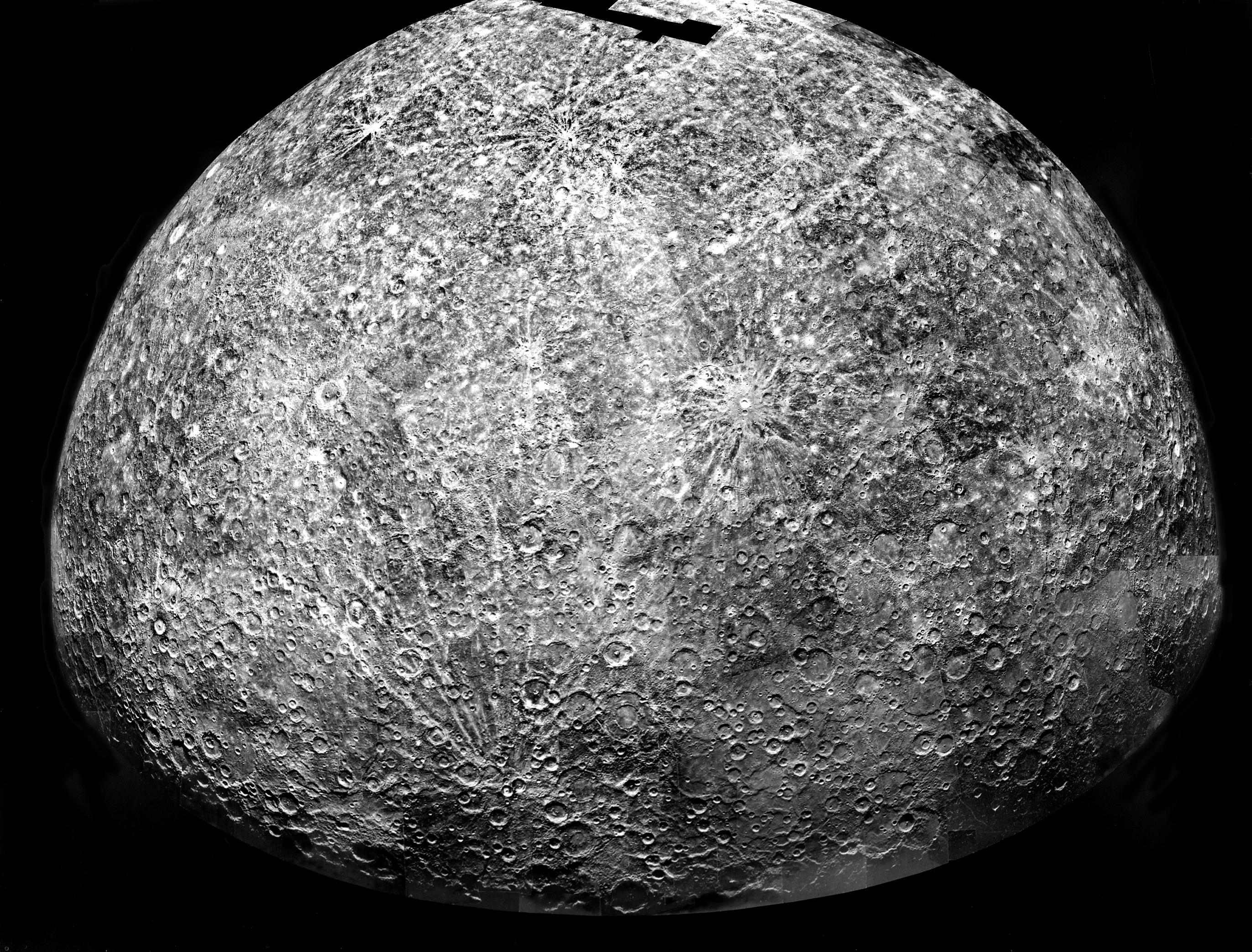
A mosaic of images from the second encounter, covering the equator to the south pole.

=== Third Mercury flyby ===
After losing roll control in October 1974, a third and final encounter, the closest to Mercury, took place on 16 March 1975, at a range of 327 kilometers (203 mi), passing almost over the north pole.

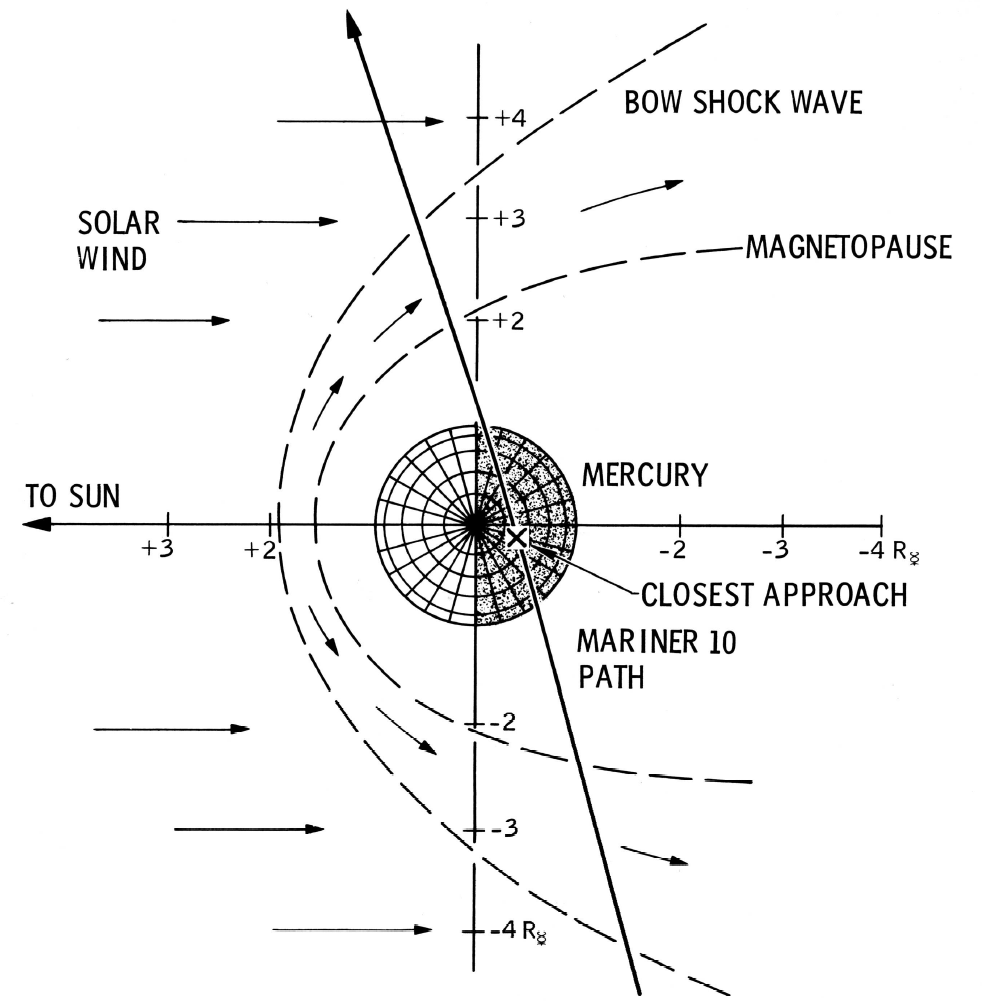
Third Mercury encounter

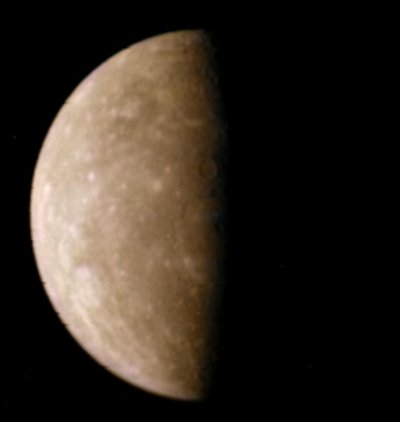
Mercury in color

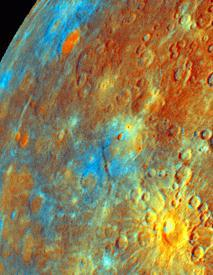
Mercury in false-color

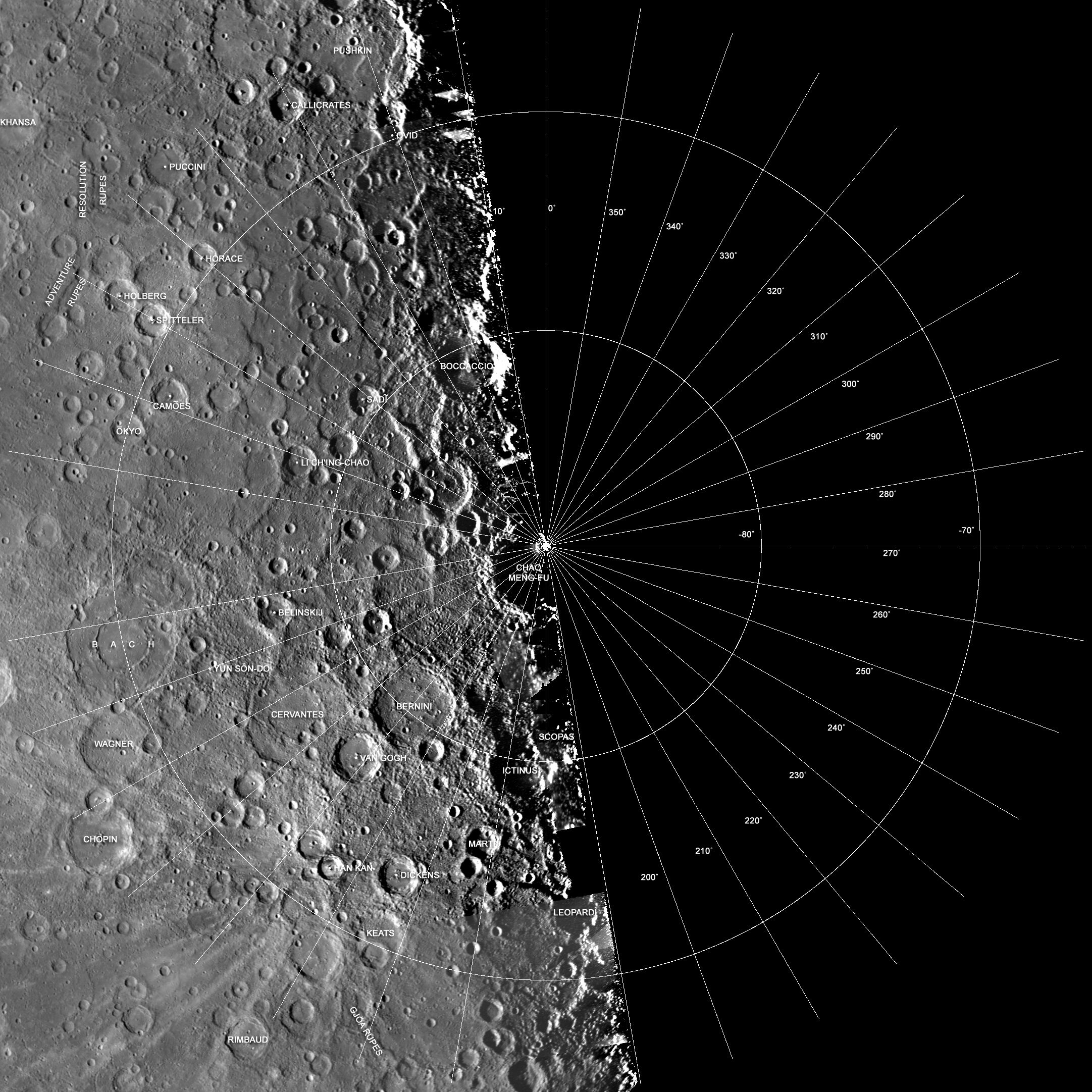
Australia region

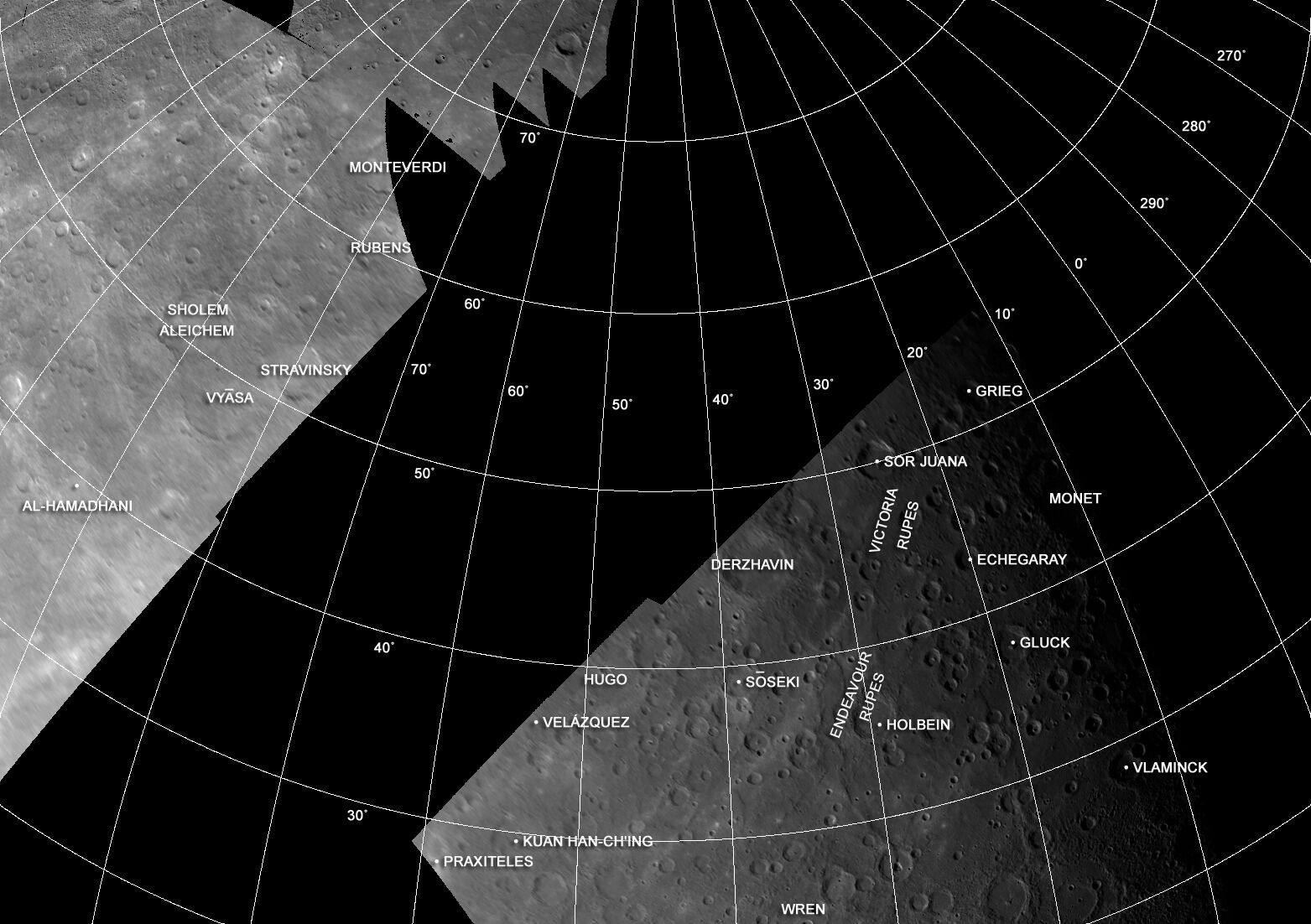
Aurora region

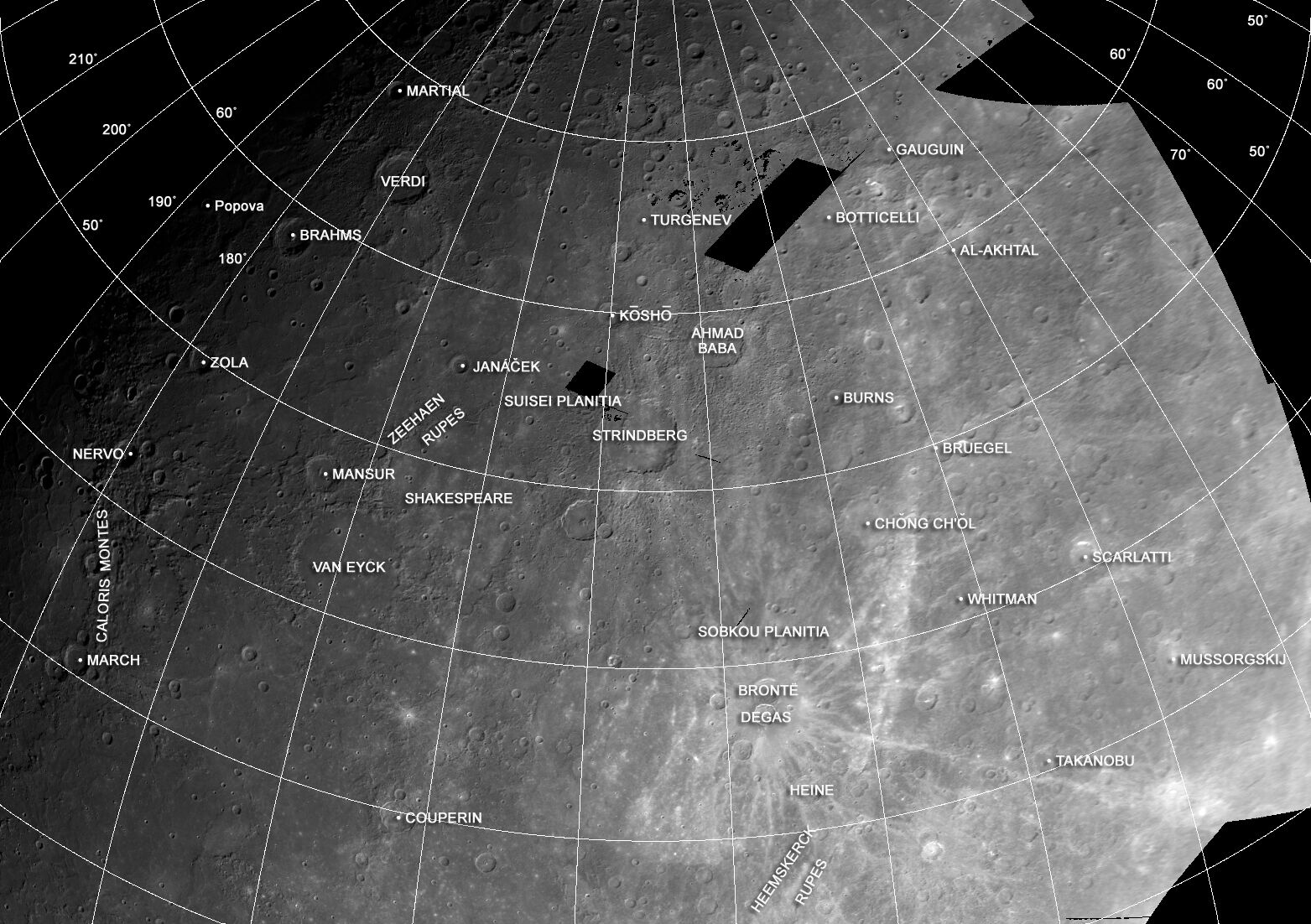
Caduceata region

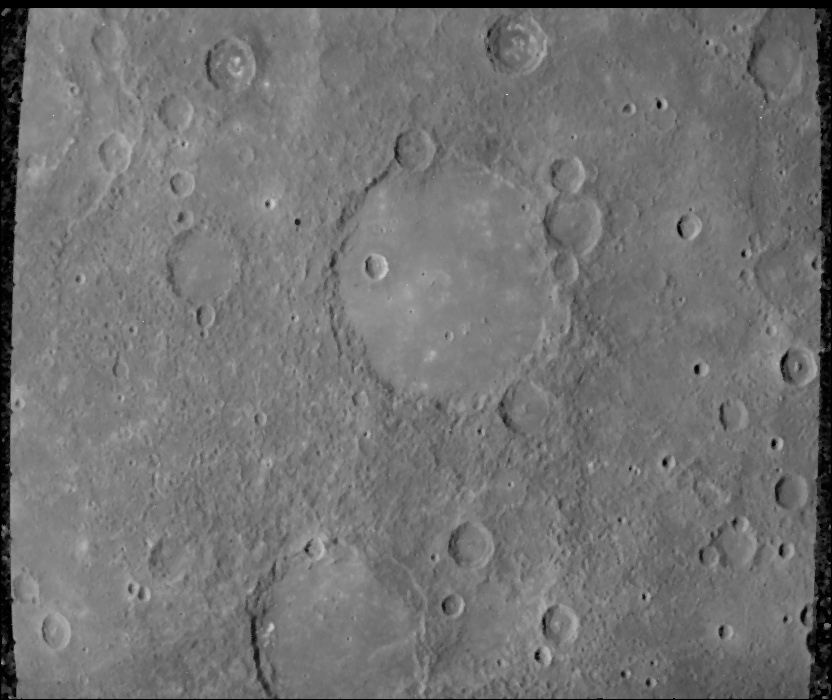
The Schubert basin, 190 km (120 mi) in diameter, filled by smooth plains. The basin's hummocky rim is partly degraded and cratered by later events.

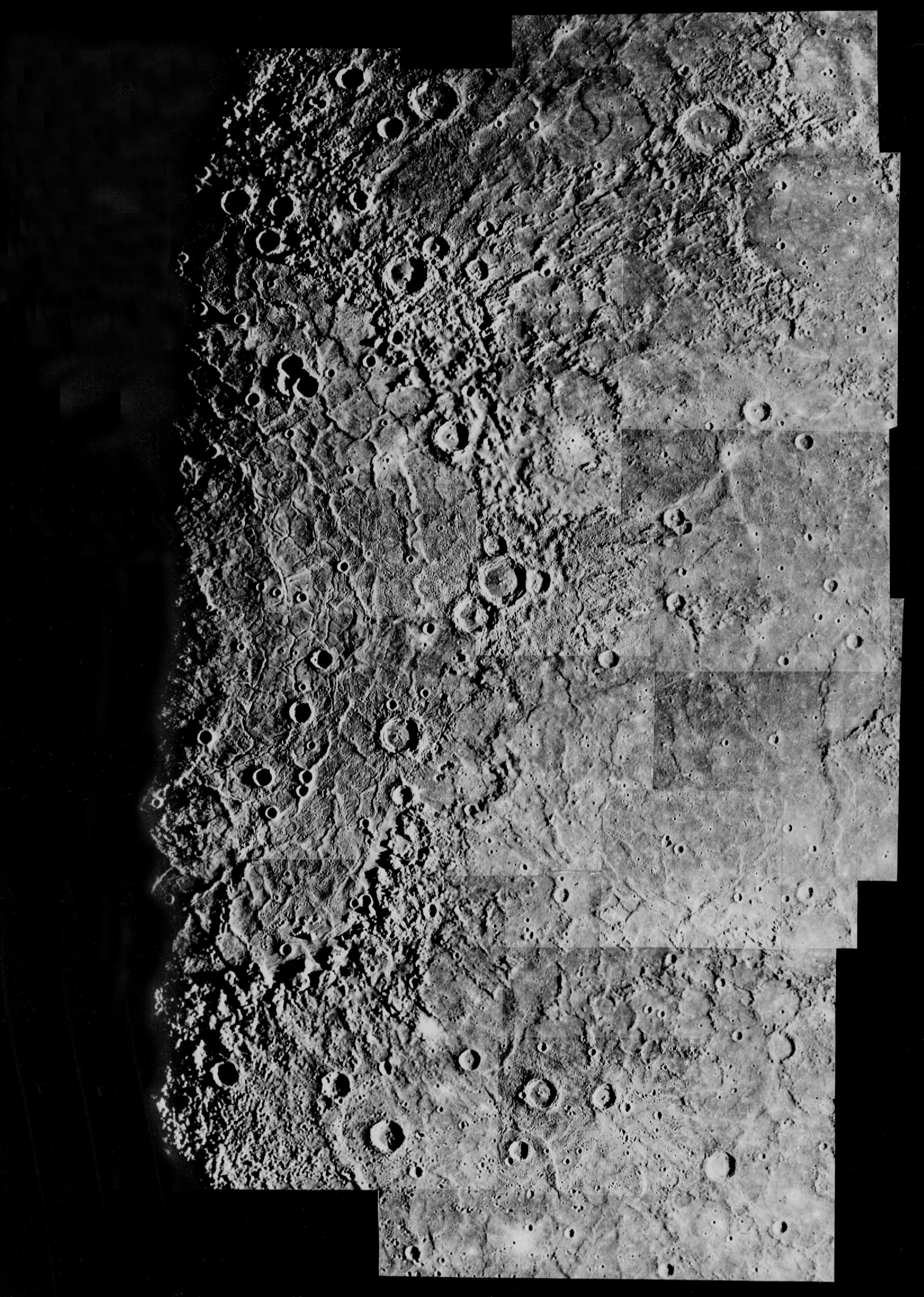
Computer Photomosaic of the Caloris Basin

== End of mission ==
With its maneuvering gas just about exhausted, Mariner 10 started another orbit of the Sun. Engineering tests were continued until 24 March 1975, when final depletion of the nitrogen supply was signaled by the onset of an un-programmed pitch turn. Commands were sent immediately to the spacecraft to turn off its transmitter, and radio signals to Earth ceased.

Mariner 10 is presumably still orbiting the Sun, although its electronics have probably been damaged by the Sun's radiation. Mariner 10 has not been spotted or tracked from Earth since it stopped transmitting. The only ways it would not be orbiting would be if it had been hit by an asteroid or gravitationally perturbed by a close encounter with a large body.

== Discoveries ==
During its flyby of Venus, Mariner 10 discovered evidence of rotating clouds and a very weak magnetic field. Using a near-ultraviolet filter, it photographed Venus's chevron clouds and performed other atmospheric studies.

The spacecraft flew past Mercury three times. Owing to the geometry of its orbit – its orbital period was almost exactly twice that of Mercury's – the same side of Mercury was sunlit each time, so it was only able to map 40–45% of Mercury's surface, taking over 2,800 photos. It revealed a more or less Moon-like surface. It contributed enormously to the understanding of Mercury, whose surface had not been successfully resolved through telescopic observation. The regions mapped included most or all of the Shakespeare, Beethoven, Kuiper, Michelangelo, Tolstoj, and Discovery quadrangles, half of Bach and Victoria quadrangles, and small portions of Solitudo Persephones (later Neruda), Liguria (later Raditladi), and Borealis quadrangles.

Mariner 10 also discovered that Mercury has a tenuous atmosphere consisting primarily of helium, as well as a magnetic field and a large iron-rich core. Its radiometer readings suggested that Mercury has a nighttime temperature of −183 °C (−297.4 °F) and maximum daytime temperatures of 187 °C (369 °F).

Planning for MESSENGER, a spacecraft that surveyed Mercury until 2015, relied extensively on data and information collected by Mariner 10.

== Mariner 10 Commemoration ==
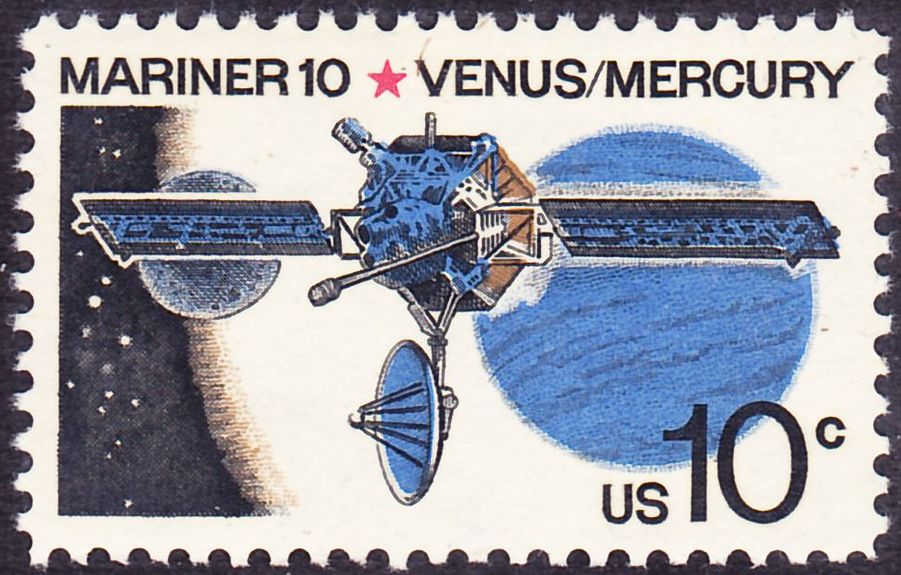
Mariner 10 space probe stamp, issue of 1975

In 1975, the US Post Office issued a commemorative stamp featuring the Mariner 10 space probe. The 10-cent Mariner 10 commemorative stamp was issued on 4 April 1975, at Pasadena, California.

== See also ==
- 1973 in spaceflight
- Exploration of Mercury
- List of missions to Venus
- Timeline of artificial satellites and space probes
- BepiColombo, ESA/JAXA mission to study Mercury in orbit (since 2018)
