= Rameau (crater) =

Crater on Mercury

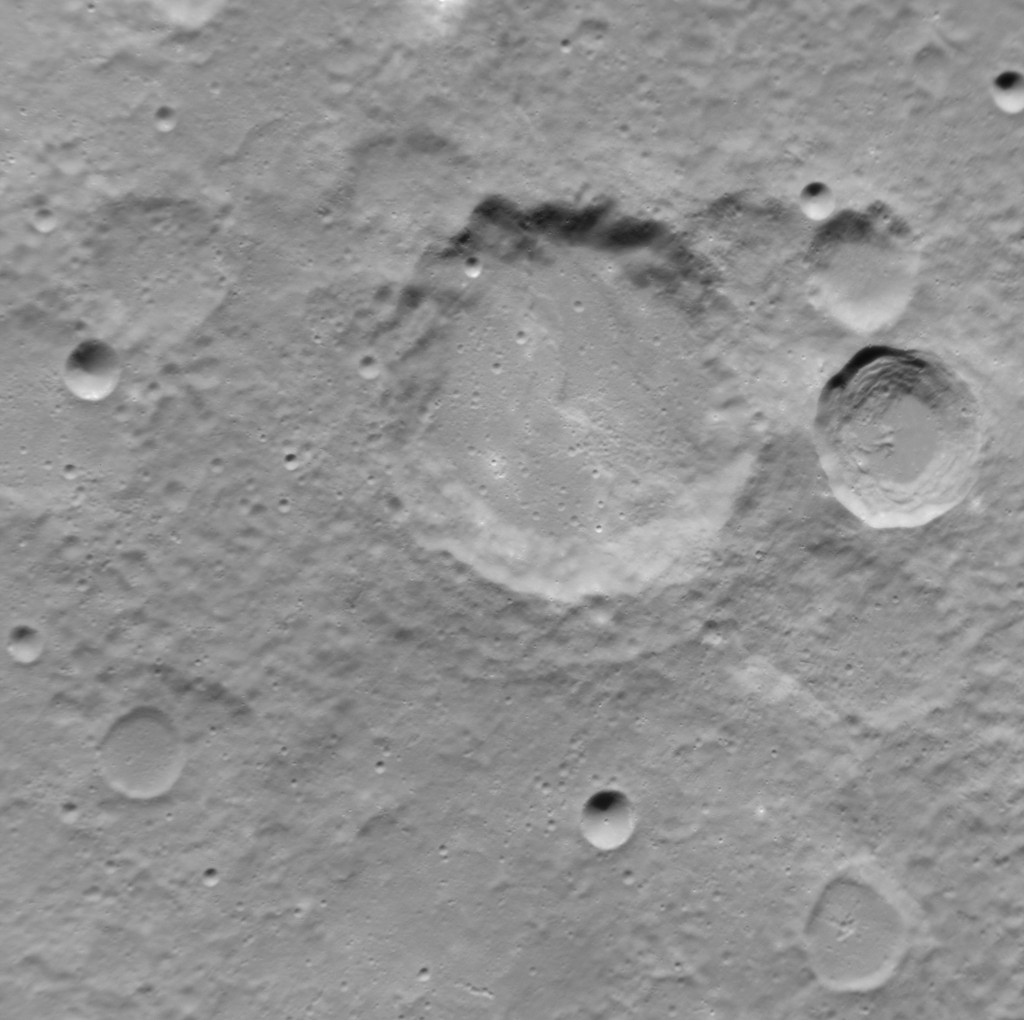
- MESSENGER NAC image
- Feature type: Impact crater
- Location: Discovery quadrangle, Mercury
- Coordinates: 54.58°S 37.24°W
- Diameter: 58 km (36 mi)
- Eponym: Jean Philippe Rameau

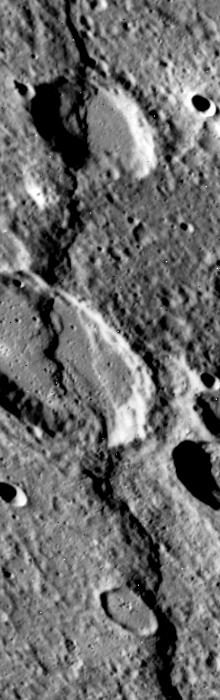
Mariner 10 image of Discovery Rupes cutting through Rameau crater (center)

Rameau is a crater on Mercury. It was named by the IAU in 1976, after French composer Jean Philippe Rameau.

The scarp Discovery Rupes cuts across Rameau crater.
