= Discovery Rupes =

Long cliff on Mercury

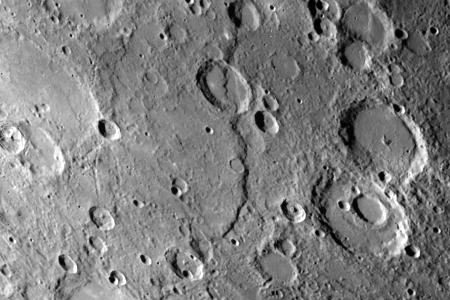
- Mariner 10 mosaic
- Feature type: Rupes
- Coordinates: 54.70°S 37.24°W
- Length: 650 km
- Eponym: HMS Discovery

Discovery Rupes is an escarpment on Mercury approximately 650 kilometers (400 mi) long and 2 kilometres (6,562 ft) high, located at latitude 56.3 S and longitude 38.3 W. It was formed by a thrust fault, thought to have occurred due to the shrinkage of the planet's core as it cooled over time. The scarp cuts through Rameau crater. It was discovered by Mariner 10.

The rupes are named after HMS Discovery, the ship used by explorer James Cook on his third voyage. The name was adopted by the International Astronomical Union in 1976.

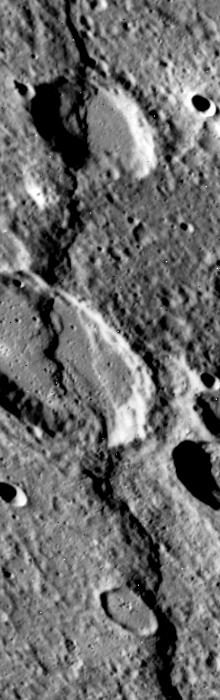
Discovery Rupes photographed during first Mariner 10 fly-by in 1974

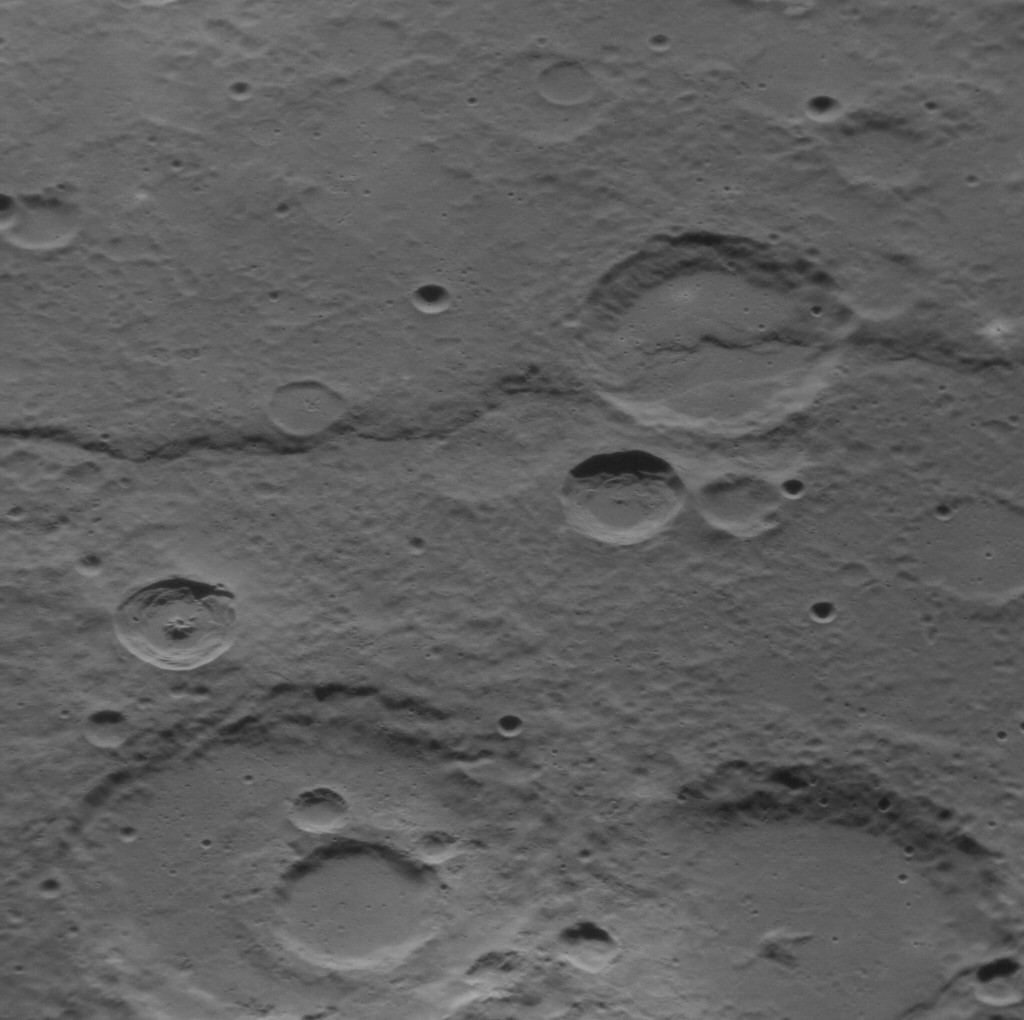
The scarp imaged by MESSENGER in 2012

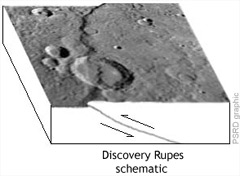
Representation of the thrust fault at Discovery Rupes

== See also ==
- List of escarpments
