= Vostok =

Vostok (Russian: Восток) refers to east in Russian but may also refer to:

== Spaceflight ==
- Vostok programme, Soviet human spaceflight project
- Vostok (spacecraft), a type of spacecraft built by the Soviet Union
- Vostok (rocket family), family of rockets derived from the Soviet R-7 Semyorka ICBM designed for the human spaceflight programme
- Vostok (crater), a crater explored by the Mars rover Opportunity
- Vostok 1, the first human spaceflight

== Places ==
- Vostok Island, located in the south of Kiribati's Line Islands
- Uschod (Minsk Metro) (Russian name Vostok), a station of Minsk Metro, Minsk, Belarus
- Vostok Rupes, a mountain chain on planet Mercury

=== Antarctica ===
- Cape Vostok, the west extremity of the Havre Mountains and the northwest extremity of Alexander Island
- Vostok Station, Russian (originally Soviet) Antarctic research station
- Lake Vostok, a subglacial lake located beneath Vostok Station
- Vostok Subglacial Highlands, an east extension of Gamburtsev Subglacial Mountains

=== Russia ===
- Vostok (inhabited locality), several inhabited localities
- Vostok Bay, bay in south Primorsky Krai

== Organizations ==
- Vostok watches, a brand of watch made in Chistopol, Tatarstan, Russia
- Vostok motorcycles, a motorcycle company, participant in 1965 Grand Prix motorcycle racing season
- Vostok Gas, a Bermuda-based oil and gas investment company
- Vostok Games, a Ukrainian game developer
- Special Battalion Vostok, a Chechen military unit

== Sport ==
- Vostok Arsenyev, a Russian bandy club
- FC Vostok, a Kazakhstani football club

== Fictional entities ==
- Valentina Vostok, a comic book character appearing in books published by DC Comics
- Vostok, a member of the superhero team Soviet Super-Soldiers, which appears in Marvel Comics
- Vostok-X, a member of the superhero team Aquaman and the Others, which appears in DC Comics

== Other uses ==
- Vostok (sloop-of-war), an 1818 ship of Faddey Bellingshausen during the First Russian Antarctic Expedition
- Vostok traverse, a 1962 Australian expedition across Antarctica
- Exercise Vostok, Russian military exercises, similar to Exercise Zapad
- Road to Vostok, an upcoming Finnish video game

== See also ==
- East (disambiguation)
- Vostok Battalion (disambiguation)
