= Gamburtsev =

Gamburtsev (m.; Russian: Гамбурцев) or Gamburtseva (f.; Russian: Гамбурцева) may refer to:

- Grigory Gamburtsev (1903–1955; Russian: Григо́рий Алекса́ндрович Га́мбурцев), Soviet seismologist
- Gamburtsev Mountain Range, a mountain range in Eastern Antarctica, named for the seismologist
- RV Akademik Gamburtsev (IMO 8118994; Russian: АКАДЕМИК ГАМБУРЦЕВ), a Soviet polar oceanographic survey ship, an Akademik Shuleykin-class research vessel
