= Vostok (inhabited locality) =

Vostok (Russian: Восток) is the name of several inhabited localities in Russia.

Urban localities

- Vostok, Primorsky Krai, an urban-type settlement in Krasnoarmeysky District of Primorsky Krai

Rural localities

- Vostok, Astrakhan Oblast, a selo in Vostochinsky Selsoviet of Yenotayevsky District of Astrakhan Oblast
- Vostok, Ilishevsky District, Republic of Bashkortostan, a village in Kuzhbakhtinsky Selsoviet of Ilishevsky District of the Republic of Bashkortostan
- Vostok, Ishimbaysky District, Republic of Bashkortostan, a village in Isheyevsky Selsoviet of Ishimbaysky District of the Republic of Bashkortostan
- Vostok, Kaluga Oblast, a selo in Baryatinsky District of Kaluga Oblast
- Vostok, Karachay-Cherkess Republic, a khutor in Karachayevsky District of the Karachay-Cherkess Republic
- Vostok, Kirov Oblast, a settlement in Zaytsevsky Rural Okrug of Kotelnichsky District of Kirov Oblast
- Vostok, Krasnoyarsk Krai, a settlement in Pokrovsky Selsoviet of Abansky District of Krasnoyarsk Krai
- Vostok, Lipetsk Oblast, a settlement in Bigildinsky Selsoviet of Dankovsky District of Lipetsk Oblast
- Vostok, Sakhalin Oblast, a selo in Poronaysky District of Sakhalin Oblast
- Vostok, Samara Oblast, a railway crossing loop in Bezenchuksky District of Samara Oblast
- Vostok, Saratov Oblast, a settlement in Marksovsky District of Saratov Oblast
- Vostok, Tomsk Oblast, a settlement in Kargasoksky District of Tomsk Oblast
- Vostok, Tver Oblast, a settlement in Slavnovskoye Rural Settlement of Kalininsky District of Tver Oblast
- Vostok, Tyumen Oblast, a settlement in Leninsky Rural Okrug of Abatsky District of Tyumen Oblast
- Vostok, Udmurt Republic, a pochinok in Byginsky Selsoviet of Sharkansky District of the Udmurt Republic
