= Rilke (crater) =

Crater on Mercury

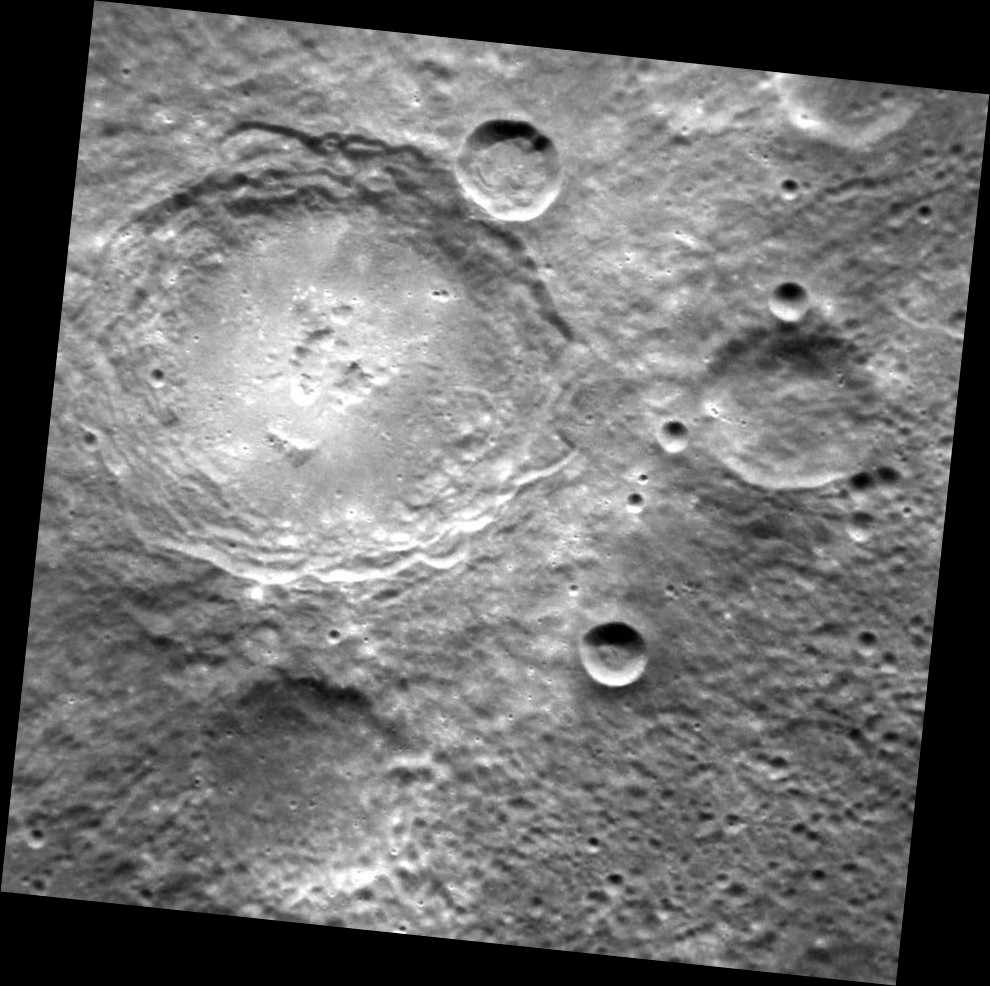
- MESSENGER NAC
- Planet: Mercury
- Coordinates: 44.81°S 12.57°W
- Quadrangle: Discovery
- Diameter: 82 km (51 mi)
- Eponym: Rainer Maria Rilke

Rilke is a crater on Mercury. Its name was adopted by the International Astronomical Union (IAU) in 1976. Rilke is named for the German poet Rainer Maria Rilke.

There is an irregular depression near the center of the crater. Such depressions in similar craters (for example Glinka, Gibran, or Picasso) are thought to be caused by explosive volcanism.

To the north of Rilke are Matabei and Pigalle craters. To the southwest are Po Ya and Sōtatsu.

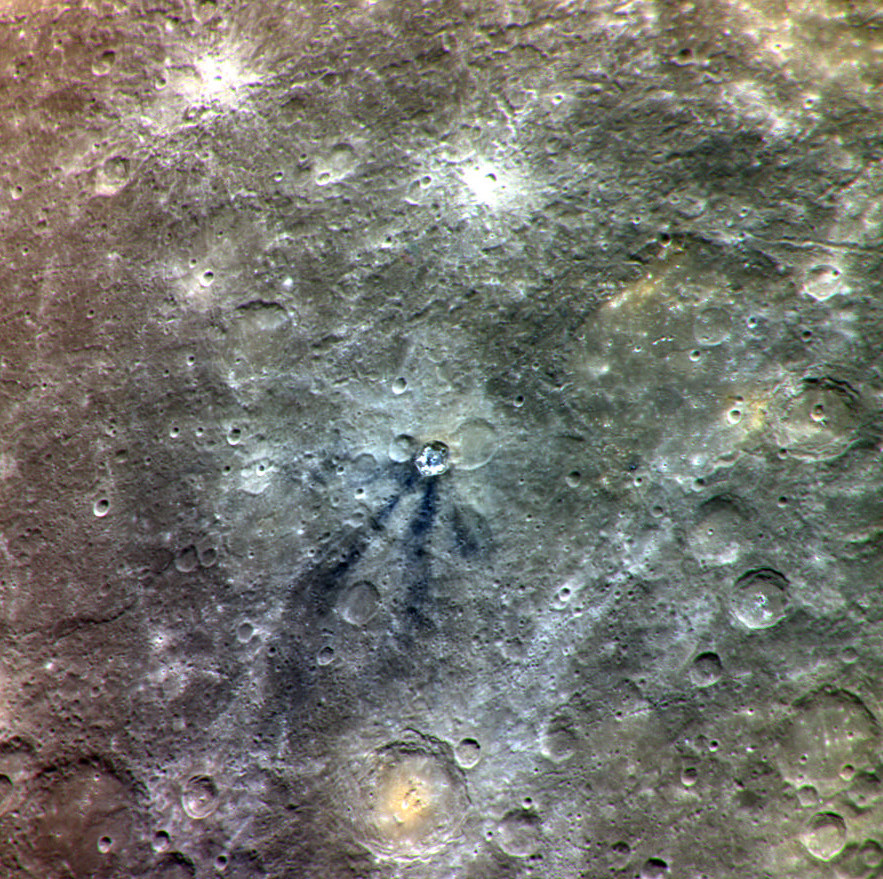
Exaggerated color view with Rilke at bottom center. Note the bright yellow color around the depression.

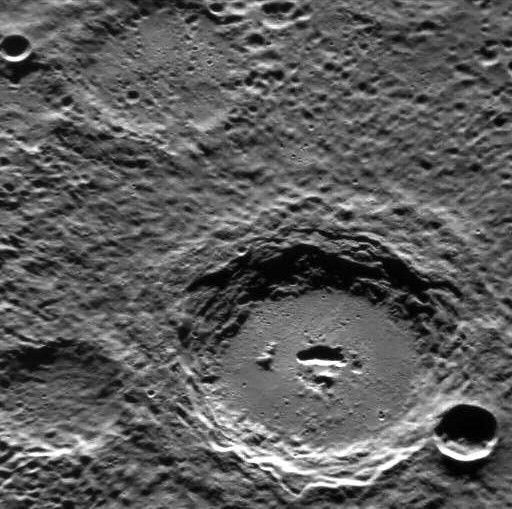
Oblique view of Rilke clearly showing the irregular depression near center

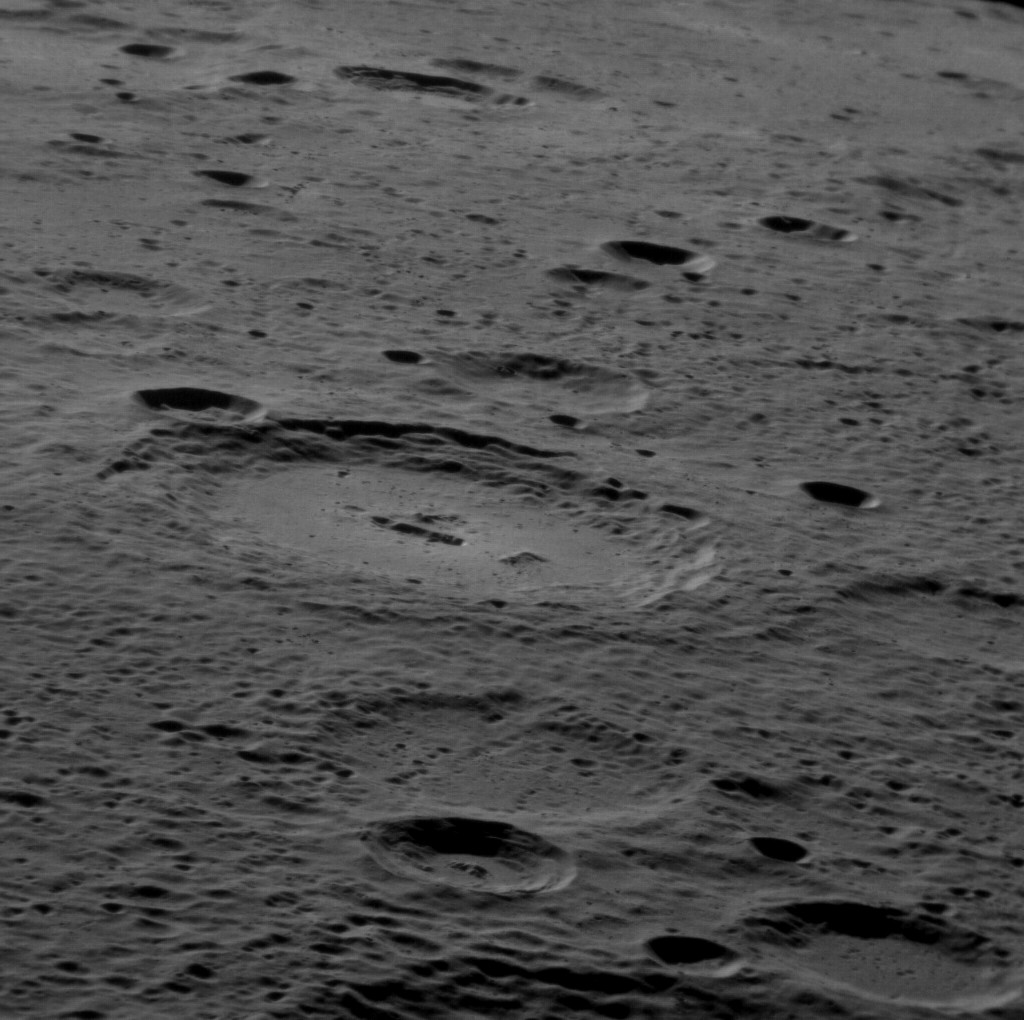
Distant oblique view
