= Vostok Rupes =

Escarpment on Mercury

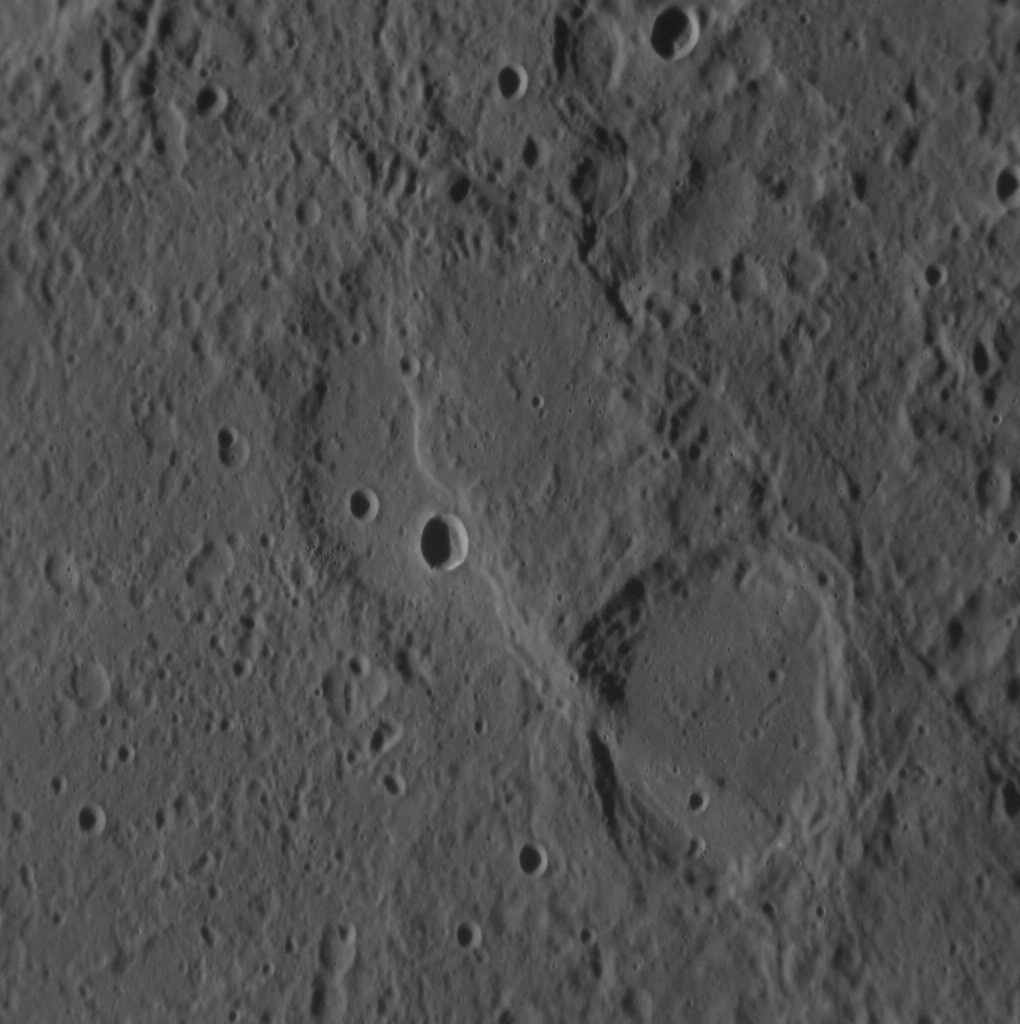
- Feature type: Rupes
- Coordinates: 37.88°S 340.40°W
- Length: 124 km (77 mi)
- Eponym: Vostok

Vostok Rupes is an escarpment on Mercury. The scarp is a surface manifestation of a thrust fault, which formed when the planet contracted as its interior cooled.

Vostok Rupes cuts across the crater Guido d'Arezzo and across a larger, unnamed crater to the northwest.

Vostok Rupes is named after Russian ship Vostok, which led the First Russian Antarctic Expedition in 1819–1821, commanded by Fabian Gottlieb von Bellingshausen.

== See also ==
- List of escarpments
