= Barysaŭski trakt =

Minsk Metro station

Barysaŭski Trakt Барысаўскі тракт
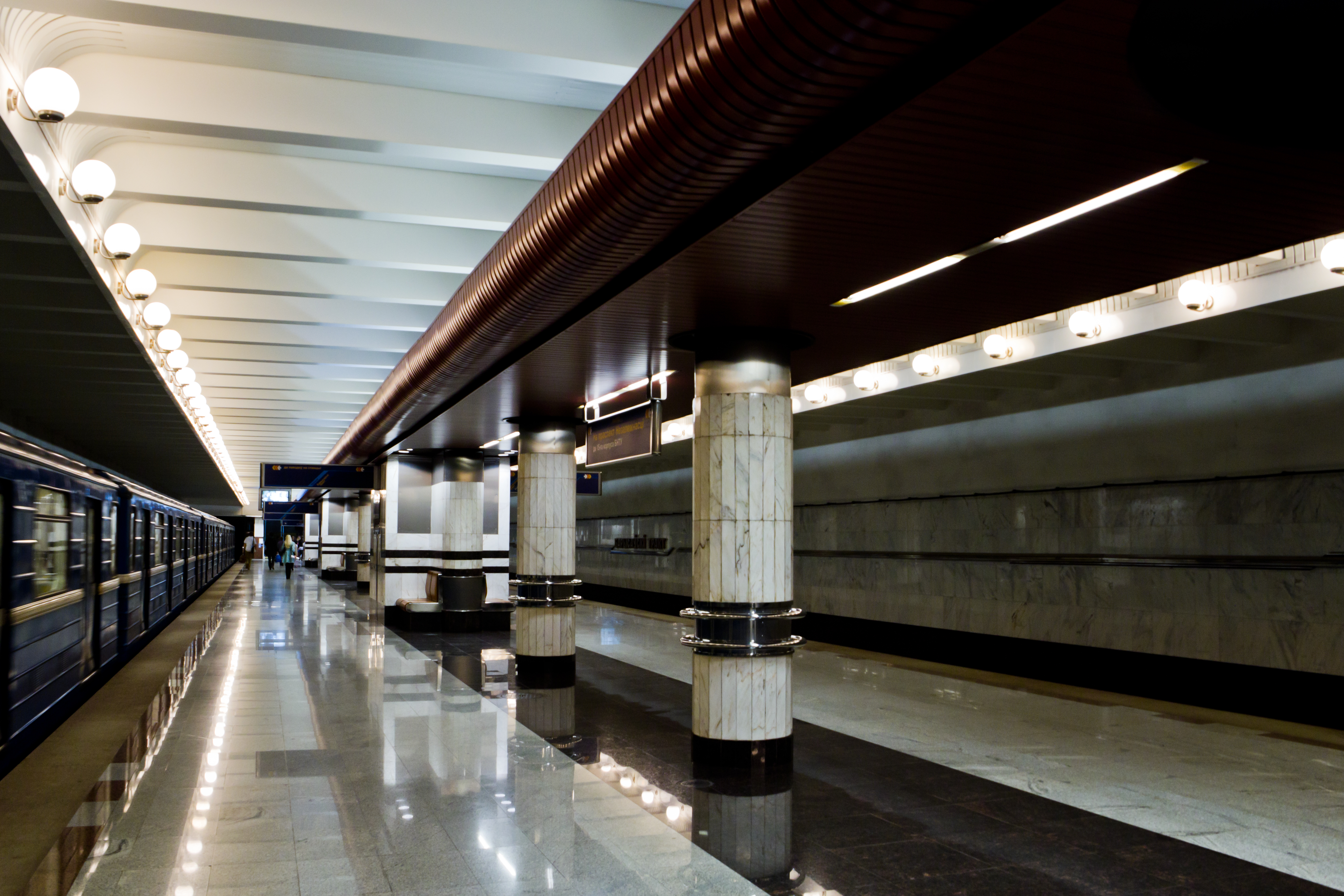
- Station Hall

General information
- Other names: Barysawski trakt, Borisovskiy trakt
- Coordinates: 53°56′21″N 27°40′2″E
- System: Minsk Metro
- Owner: Minsk Metro
- Line: Maskoŭskaja line
- Platforms: 1 island platform
- Tracks: 2

Construction
- Structure type: Underground

Other information
- Station code: 123

History
- Opened: 7 November 2007; 18 years ago

Services
Preceding station	Minsk Metro	Following station
Uručča Terminus	Maskoŭskaja line	Uschod towards Malinawka
Location
- Location within Belarus

Barysaŭski trakt, (also referred to as Barysawski trakt or Borisovskiy trakt) (Belarusian: Барысаўскі тракт; Russian: Борисовский тракт, romanized: Borisovskiy trakt, IPA: [bɐˈrʲisəfskʲɪj trakt]) is a Minsk Metro station on the Maskoŭskaja line. Opened on 7 November 2007 the station's name is derived from the Barysaw Highway which leads to a city that is northeast of Minsk.

The station will be a standard single level pillar-bispan with hi-tech aesthetic design of white and red colours. Station exits will lead to the Belarusian National Technical University and East (Maskowskija) cemetery.
