= Matabei (crater) =

Crater on Mercury

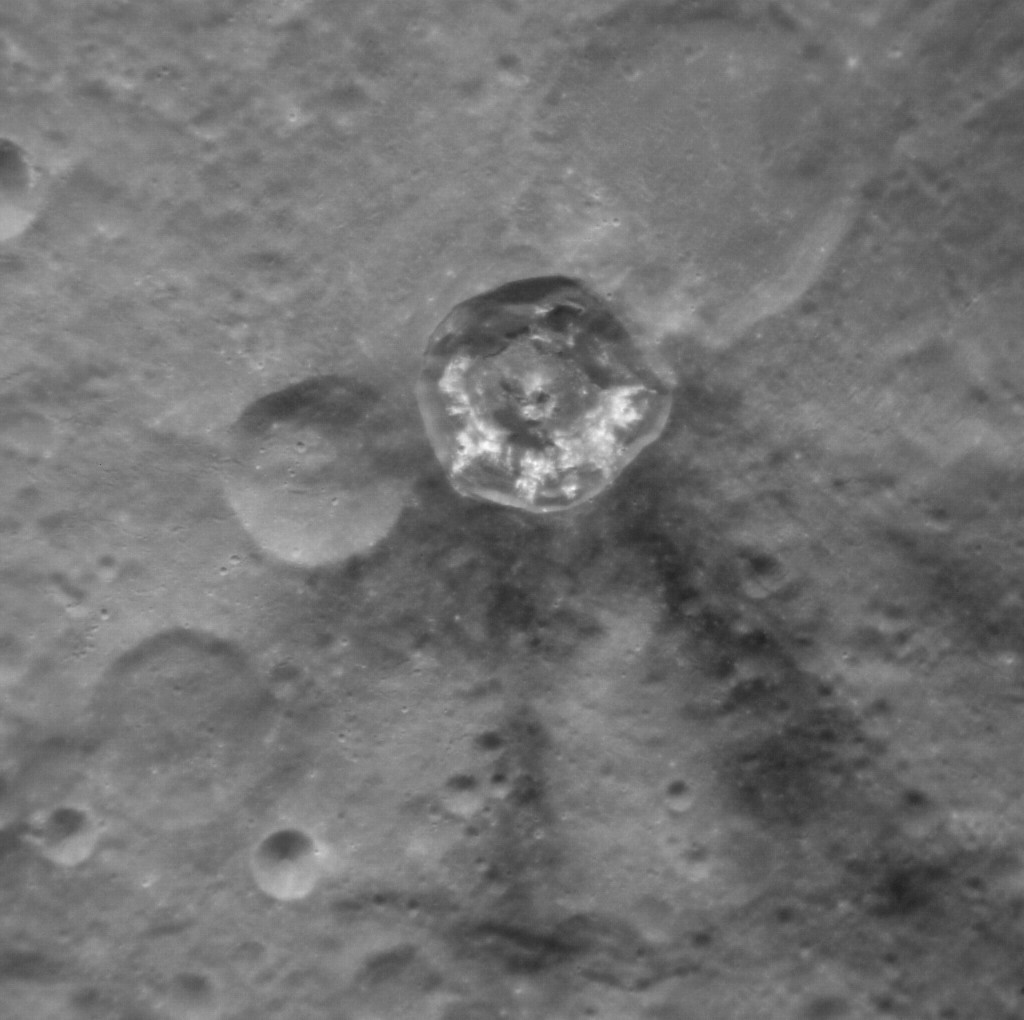
- MESSENGER NAC image of Matabei
- Feature type: Impact crater
- Location: Discovery quadrangle, Mercury
- Coordinates: 39.7°S 13.9°W
- Diameter: 24 km (15 mi)
- Eponym: Iwasa Matabei

Matabei is an impact crater on Mercury. It has a set of dark rays. Dark rays are rare on Mercury, but other occurrences have been identified, such as at Mozart crater. Mozart crater is interpreted to have excavated dark material from depth during the impact event, creating dark streamers. The dark rays from Matabei may have a similar origin.

Matabei was named by the IAU in 2009 after Japanese painter Iwasa Matabei.

To the northeast of Matabei is the crater Pigalle. To the south is Rilke, and to the northwest is Guido d'Arezzo.

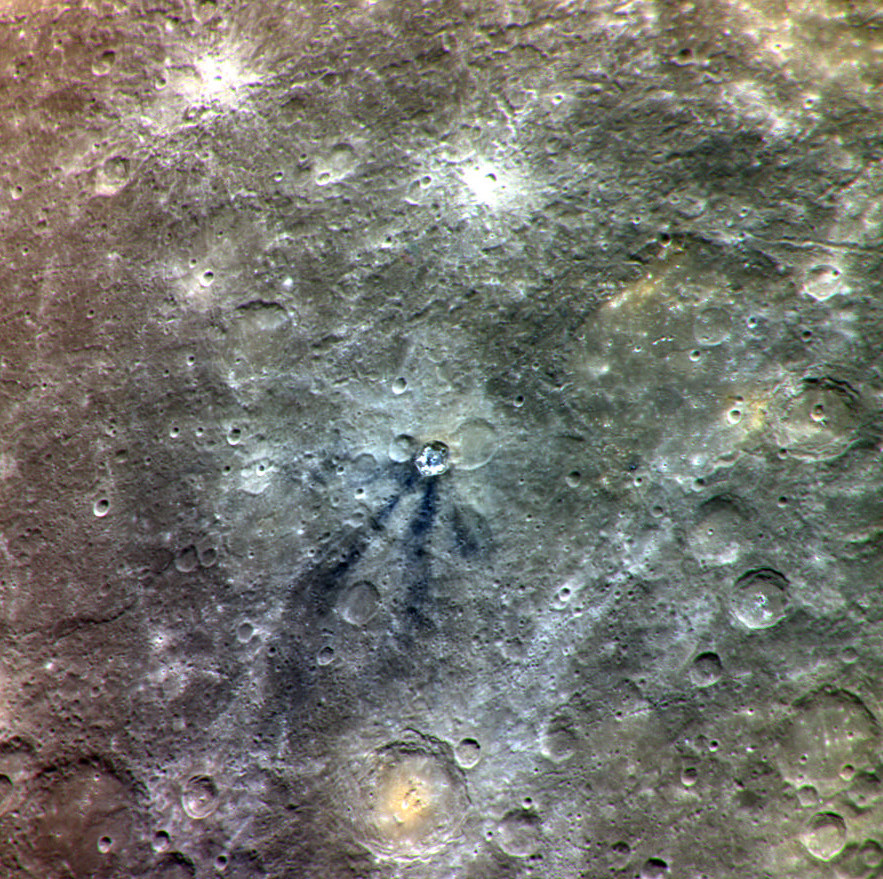
Exaggerated color view with Matabei at center

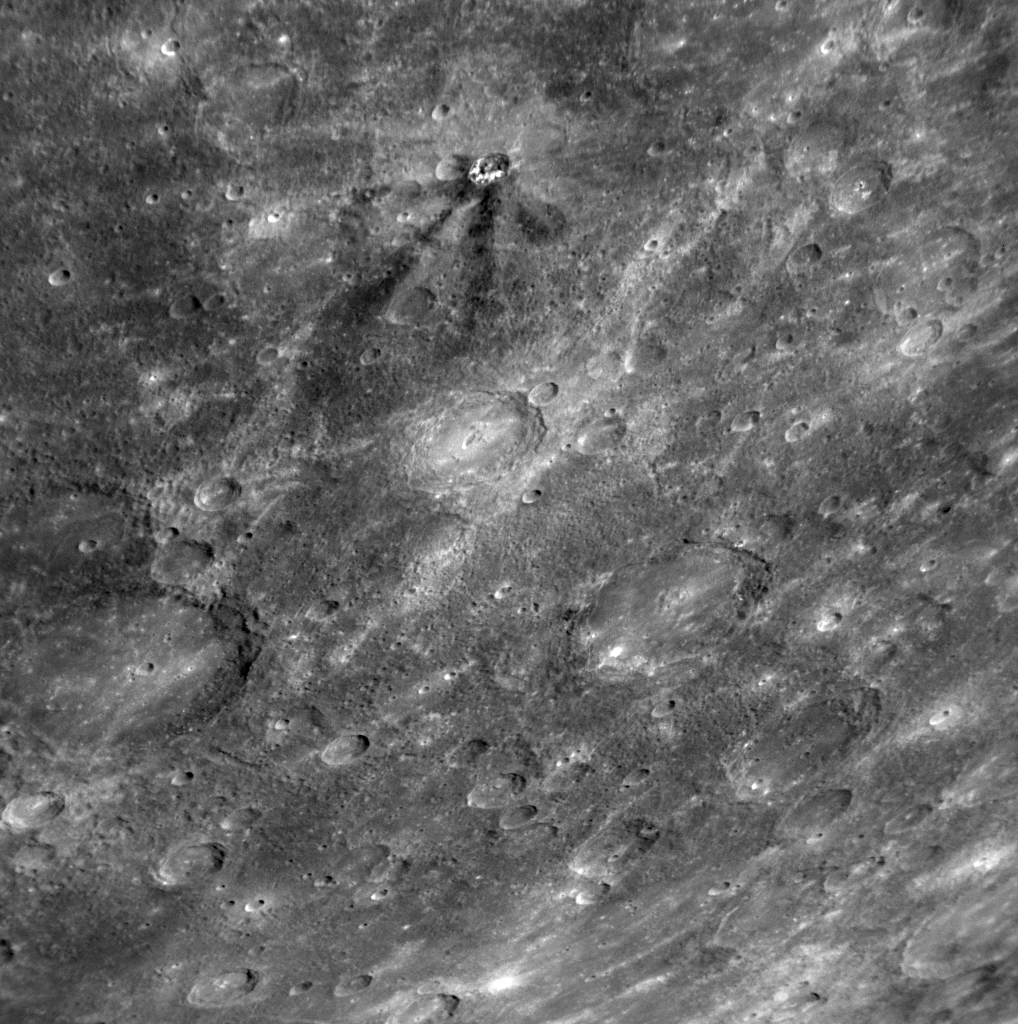
Oblique image acquired by MESSENGER on its second flyby in October 2008
