= Pigalle (crater) =

Crater on Mercury

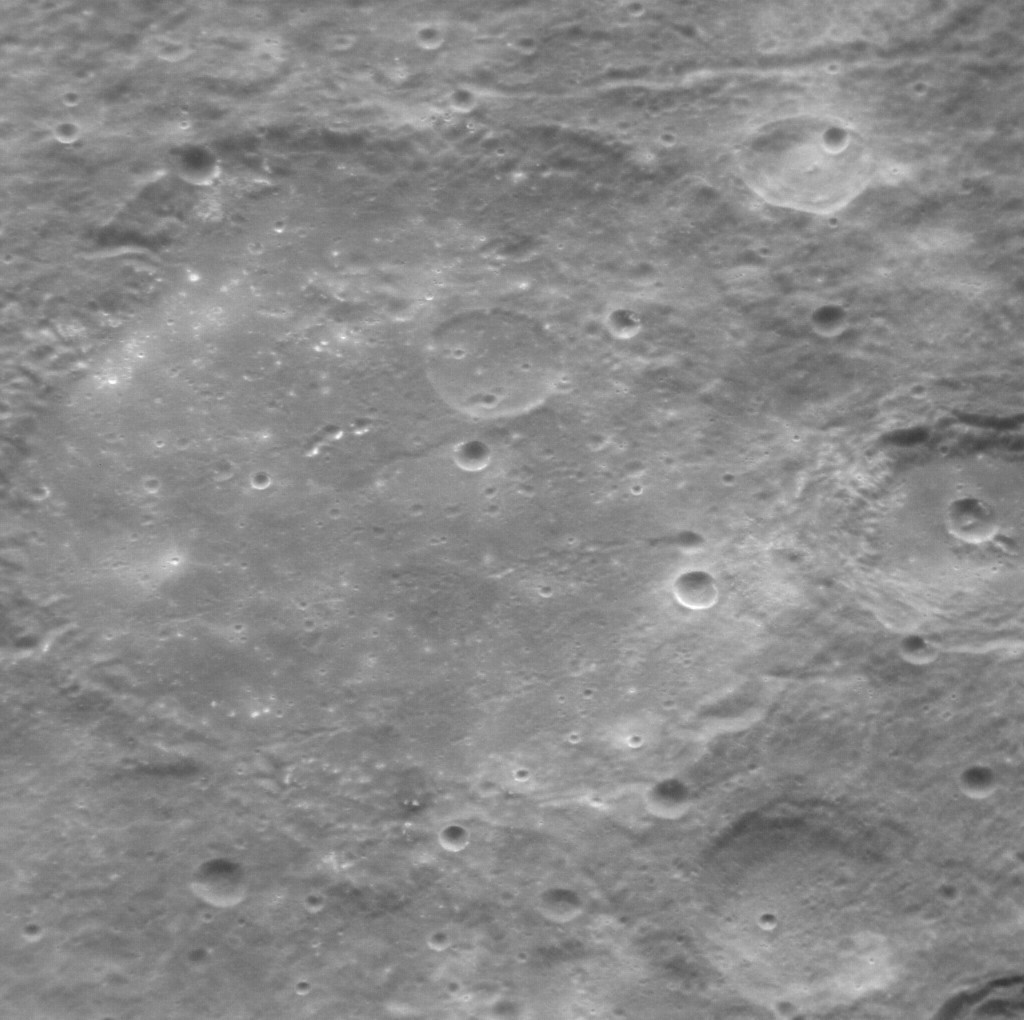
- Oblique MESSENGER NAC image
- Planet: Mercury
- Coordinates: 37.65°S 9.64°W
- Quadrangle: Discovery
- Diameter: 153 km (95 mi)
- Eponym: Jean-Baptiste Pigalle

Pigalle is a crater on Mercury. It has a diameter of 153 kilometres (95 miles). Its name was adopted by the International Astronomical Union (IAU) in 1976. Pigalle is named for the French sculptor Jean-Baptiste Pigalle.

To the southwest of Pigalle is the crater Matabei, and to the west is Guido d'Arezzo.

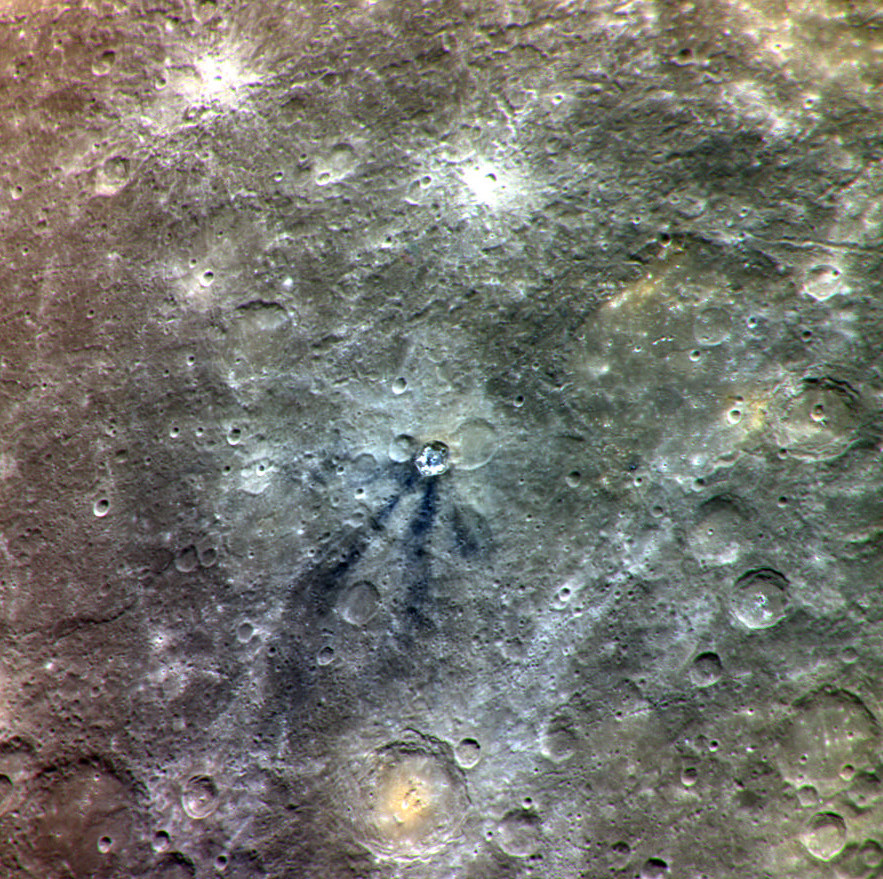
Exaggerated color view with Pigalle at upper right

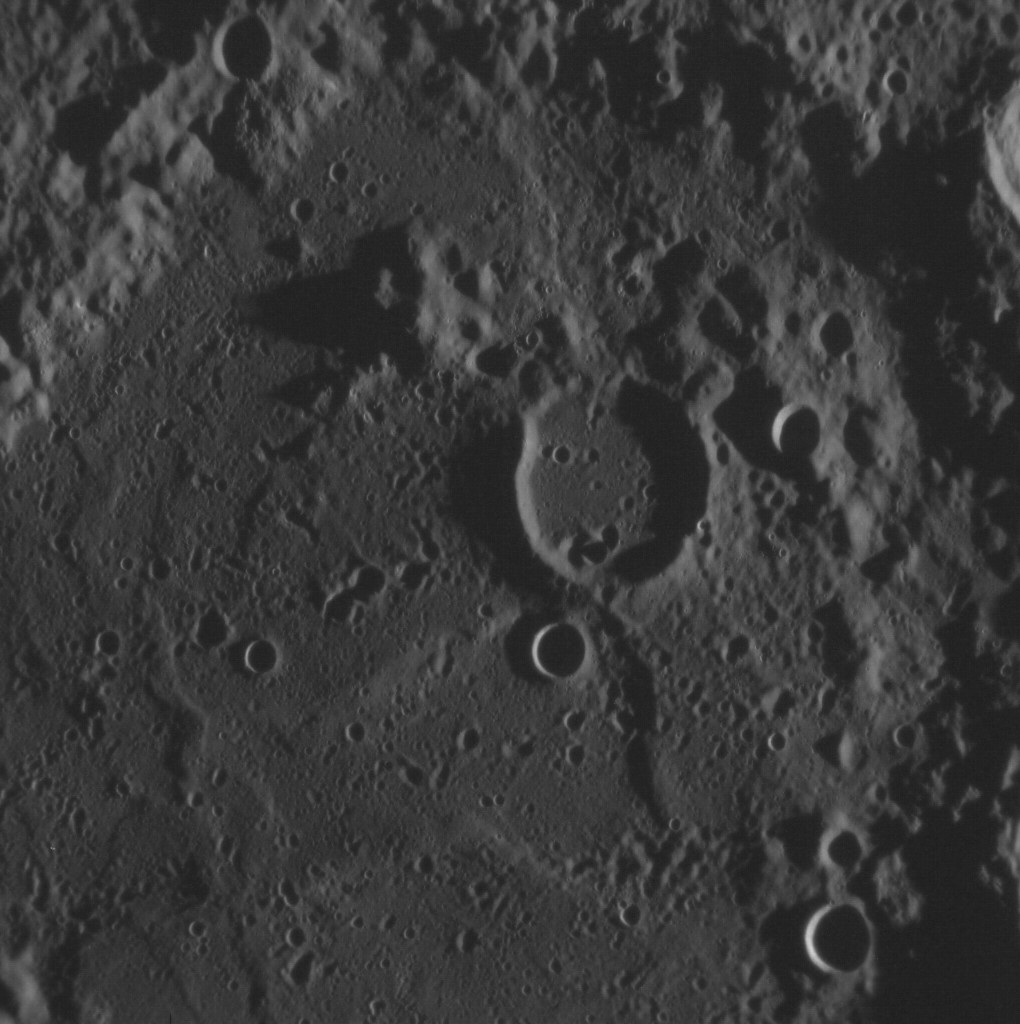
Most of the interior of Pigalle
