= Vostok, Ishimbaysky District, Republic of Bashkortostan =

Vostok Восток
- Village
- Location within Bashkortostan Location within Russia
- Coordinates: 53°38′N 56°04′E
- Country: Russia
- Region: Bashkortostan
- District: Ishimbaysky District
- Time zone: UTC+5:00

Vostok (Russian: Восток) is a rural locality (a village) in Isheyevsky Selsoviet, Ishimbaysky District, Bashkortostan, Russia. The population was 223 as of 2010. There are 5 streets.

== Geography ==
Vostok is located 23 km north of Ishimbay (the district's administrative centre) by road. Yangi-Aul is the nearest rural locality.
