= Grigory Gamburtsev =

Soviet seismologist

- Born: March 23, 1903; Saint Petersburg, Russian Empire
- Died: June 28, 1955 (aged 52); Moscow, Soviet Union
- Education: Moscow State University
- Scientific career
- Fields: Physicist, seismometry
- Workplaces: Schmidt Institute of the Physics of the Earth

Grigory Aleksandrovich Gamburtsev (Russian: Григо́рий Алекса́ндрович Га́мбурцев; 23 March [O.S. 10 March] 1903 – June 28, 1955) was a Soviet seismologist and academician from Saint Petersburg, Russia who worked in the area of seismometry and earthquake prediction.

== Life ==
Gamburtsev was born on March 23, 1903, in Saint Petersburg, Russia. He graduated from the Moscow State University in 1926. From 1938 onward, he worked at the Geophysical Institute of the USSR Academy of Sciences, serving as its director from 1949 to 1955. In 1946, Gamburtsev became a corresponding member of the USSR Academy of Sciences and in 1953 he became full member of the Academy. Gamburtsev developed a new design of seismographs and created their theory. He proposed a new method for the mineral exploration, so called correlation refraction method, and the deep sounding method for monitoring the Earth crust. He died on June 28, 1955, in Moscow.

== Honors ==
Gamburtsev received several government awards for his scientific work, including the USSR State Prize (1941), the Order of the Red Banner of Labour (1945), and the Order of Lenin (1953). The Gamburtsev Mountain Range, a range of sub-glacial mountains near Dome A in Eastern Antarctica, was discovered in 1958 by the 3rd Soviet Antarctic Expedition and named after him in the same year; Val Gamburtsev, an oil deposit in Nenets Autonomous Okrug, (part of Arkhangelsk Oblast), is also named for him.

On April 21–24, 2003, the international scientific conference “The Scientific Legacy of Academician G. A. Gamburtsev and Modern Geophysics” was held.

The Institute of Physics of the Earth of the Russian Academy of Sciences was named after Grigory Alexandrovich Gamburtsev. It is part of the Russian Academy of Sciences institution “O. Yu. Schmidt Institute of Physics of the Earth of the Russian Academy of Sciences.”
