= Vostok, Ilishevsky District, Republic of Bashkortostan =

Vostok Восток
- Village
- Location within Bashkortostan Location within Russia
- Coordinates: 55°37′N 54°37′E
- Country: Russia
- Region: Bashkortostan
- District: Ilishevsky District
- Time zone: UTC+5:00

Vostok (Russian: Восток) is a rural locality (a village) in Kuzhbakhtinsky Selsoviet, Ilishevsky District, Bashkortostan, Russia. The population was 29 as of 2010. There is 1 street.

== Geography ==
Vostok is located 41 km northeast of Verkhneyarkeyevo (the district's administrative centre) by road. Gremuchy Klyuch is the nearest rural locality.
