= Vostok Battalion =

Vostok Battalion can refer to:

- Special Battalions Vostok and Zapad, former Spetsnaz units of Russian military intelligence (GRU) based in Chechnya
- Vostok Battalion, a Russian militant group operating in the Donbas region of Ukraine, later officially part of Russian Armed Forces.
