= Russian sloop Vostok =

Russian naval vessel (1818–1828)

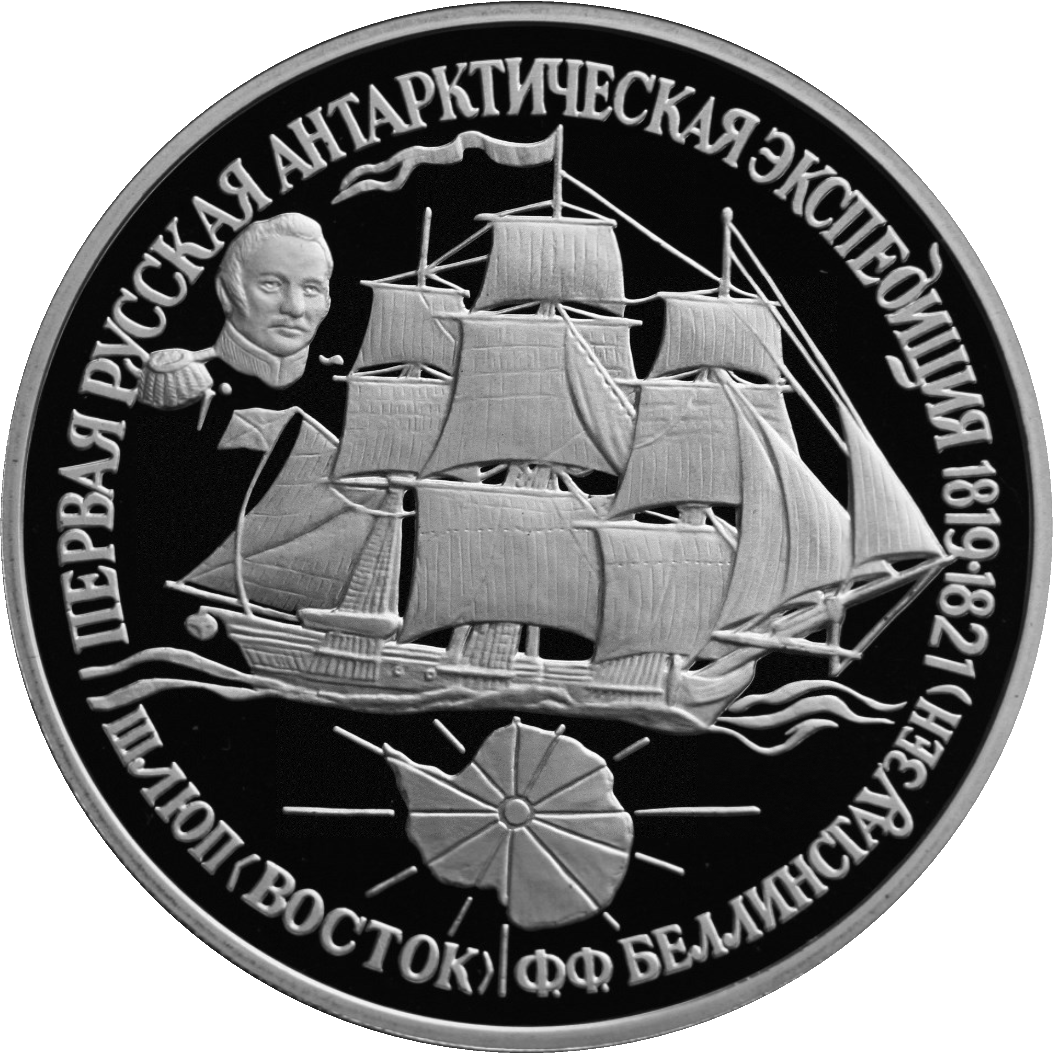
- Vostok and its captain, Fabian Gottlieb von Bellingshausen on a commemorative coin of the Bank of Russia, 1994

History

Russian Empire
- Name: Vostok
- Namesake: East
- Builder: Okhta Admiralty shipyard, Saint Petersburg
- Launched: 1818
- Home port: Kronstadt
- Fate: Broken up in 1828

General characteristics
- Type: 24-gun sloop-of-war
- Displacement: 900 tonnes
- Length: 39.62 m (130 ft 0 in)
- Beam: 10.36 m (34 ft 0 in)
- Depth of hold: 4.8 m (15 ft 9 in)
- Sail plan: Full-rigged ship
- Speed: 10 knots (19 km/h)
- Complement: 117
- Armament: 16 × 127 mm pounder guns; 12 × 120 mm carronades

Vostok (Russian: Восток) was a 28-gun sloop-of-war of the Imperial Russian Navy, the lead ship of the First Russian Antarctic Expedition in 1819–1821, during which Fabian Gottlieb von Bellingshausen (commander of the ship) and Mikhail Lazarev (commanding Mirny, the second ship) circumnavigated the globe, discovered the continent of Antarctica and twice circumnavigated it, and discovered a number of islands and archipelagos in the Southern and Pacific Oceans.

== History ==
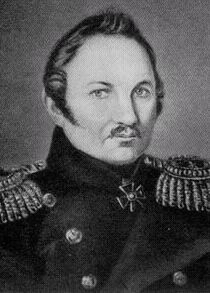
Captain Fabian Gottlieb von Bellingshausen with the Cross of the Order of St. Vladimir

Vostok was launched in 1818 at Okhta Admiralty shipyard, Saint Petersburg.

On 14 July [O.S. 3 July] 1819 Vostok under the command of Commander Fabian Gottlieb von Bellingshausen, the leader of the expedition, alongside Mirny under the command of Lieutenant Commander Mikhail Lazarev left Kronstadt and on 28 January [O.S. 16 January] 1820 reached the shore of Antarctica, which was sighted for the first time in history. After repair in Sydney in Australia, the expedition explored the tropical parts of the Pacific, and on 12 November [O.S. 31 October] 1820 again turned to Antarctica. On 22 January [O.S. 10 January] 1821 the sloops reached the southernmost point of their voyage at 69° 53' S and 92° 19' W. On 5 August [O.S. 24 July] 1821 they returned to Kronstadt.

In 751 days they covered 49,723 miles (approx. 92,300 km). Apart from the discovery of the world's sixth continent, Antarctica, 29 islands were mapped and complex oceanographic works carried out. A medal was issued by the Russian Admiralty to commemorate the expedition.

In 1828 sloop Vostok was excluded from navy lists and scrapped.

== Named in honor ==
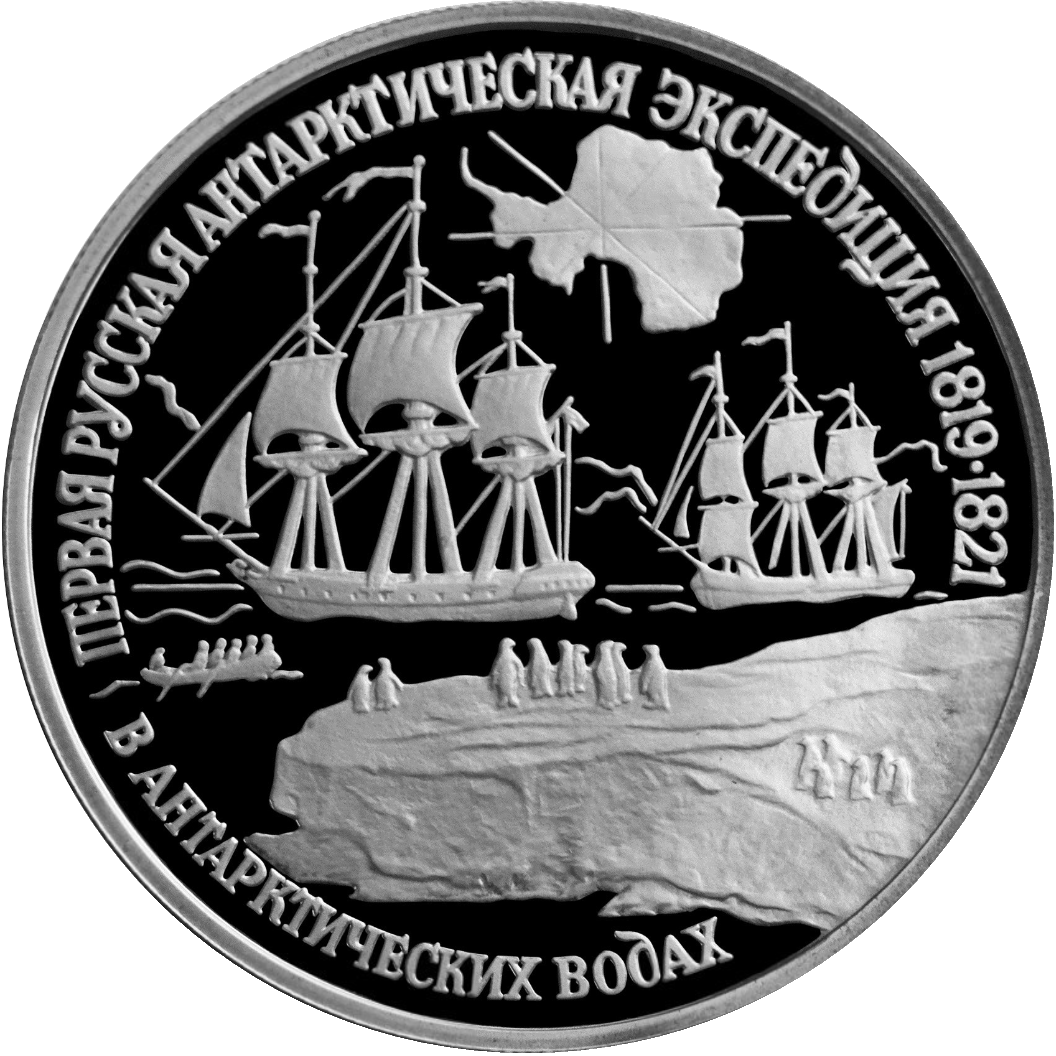
Vostok (left) and Mirny (right) during the First Russian Antarctic Expedition on a coin of the Bank of Russia

- Vostok Island in the Line Islands group (Polynesia), discovered by Bellingshausen during the First Russian Antarctic Expedition in 1820.
- Cape Vostok, the western extremity of the Havre Mountains and the northwestern extremity of Alexander Island in Antarctic, discovered by Bellingshausen in 1821.
- Vostok Rupes, a mountain chain on planet Mercury.
- Vostok Station, a Russian Antarctic research station located on the Pole of Cold amid the East Antarctic Ice Sheet, established on 16 December 1957 (during the International Geophysical Year) by the 2nd Soviet Antarctic Expedition.
- Vostok Subglacial Highlands, an east extension of Gamburtsev Subglacial Mountains in Antarctica.
- Vostok Lake, the largest subglacial lake in the world is named after Vostok Station. The existence of a subglacial lake in the Vostok region was first suggested by Russian geographer Andrey Kapitsa based on seismic soundings made during the Soviet Antarctic Expeditions.
- Vostok 1, the Soviet spacecraft which carried the first man into space, Yuri Gagarin, on 12 April 1961.

== Sources ==
- Морской энциклопедический словарь. Л.: Судостроение, 1991. ISBN 5-7355-0280-8 (in Russian)
- Vostok, with model scheme at hobbyport.ru (in Russian)
