= Guido d'Arezzo (crater) =

Crater on Mercury

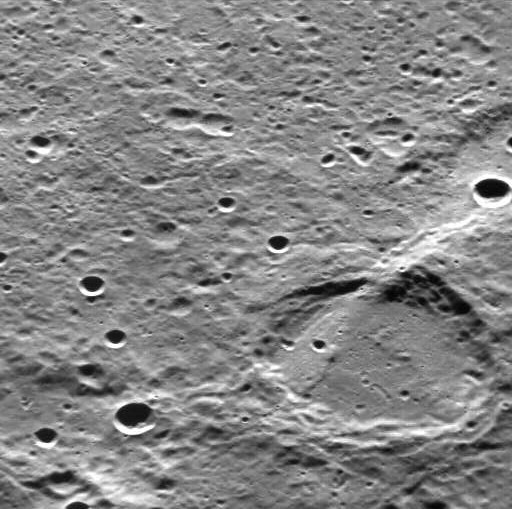
- Oblique MESSENGER NAC image of Guido d'Arezzo
- Feature type: Impact crater
- Location: Discovery quadrangle, Mercury
- Coordinates: 38.41°S 18.53°W
- Diameter: 58.0 km (36.0 mi)
- Eponym: Guido of Arezzo

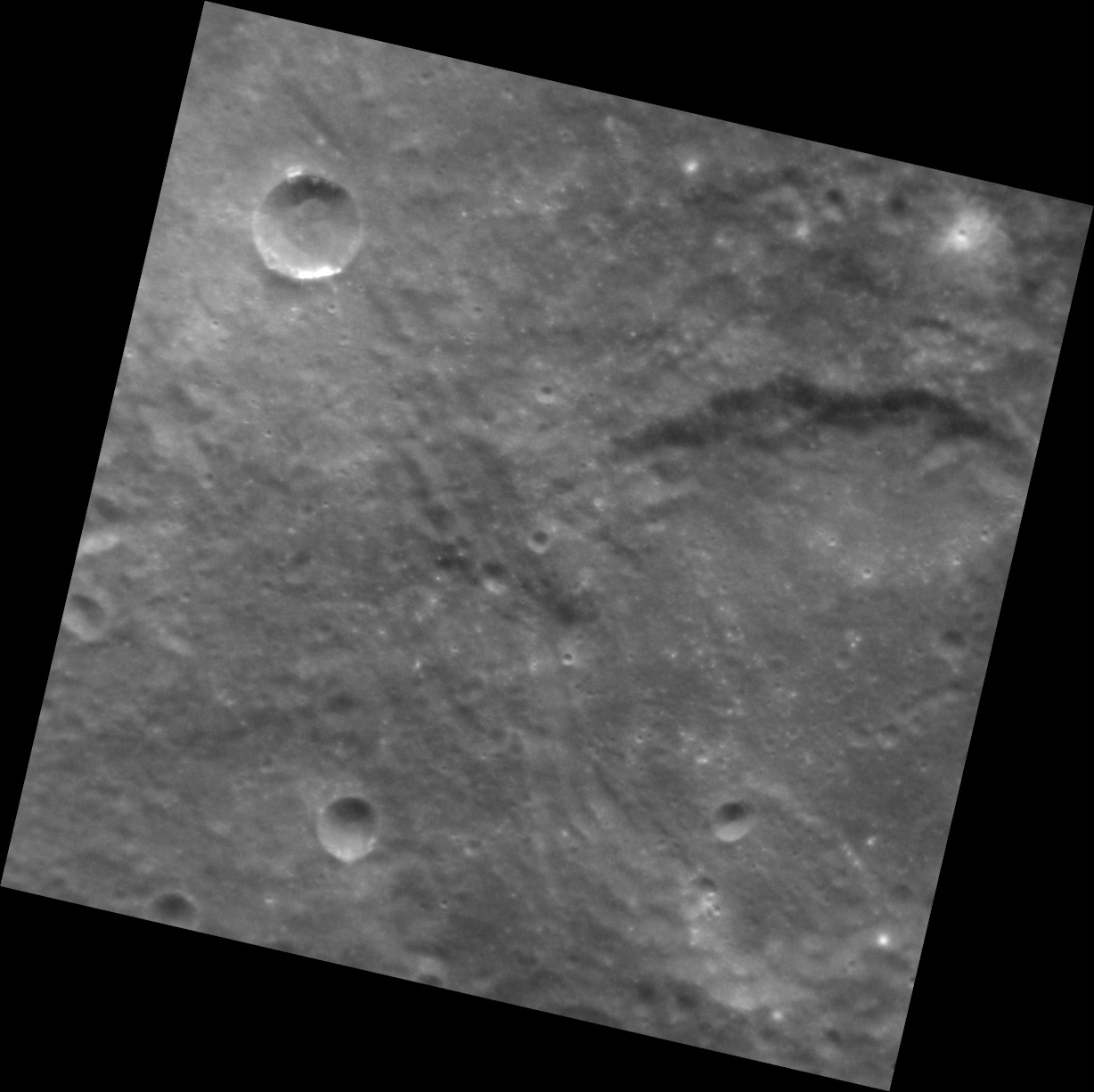
Part of Guido d'Arezzo crater at right. The small crater in upper left may have hollows on the rim.

Guido d'Arezzo is a crater on Mercury. It has a diameter of 58 kilometers. Its name was adopted by the International Astronomical Union (IAU) in 1976. Guido d'Arezzo is named for the Italian music theorist Guido of Arezzo, who lived from 990 to 1050.

The scarp Vostok Rupes cuts across Guido d'Arezzo and the unnamed crater to the northwest. The crater Matabei is to the southeast of Guido d'Arezzo.
