= Vostok, Astrakhan Oblast =

Vostok Восток
- Selo
- Location within Astrakhan Oblast Location within Russia
- Coordinates: 47°07′N 47°06′E
- Country: Russia
- Region: Astrakhan Oblast
- District: Yenotayevsky District
- Time zone: UTC+4:00

Vostok (Russian: Восток) is a rural locality (a selo) and the administrative center of Vostochinsky Selsoviet of Yenotayevsky District, Astrakhan Oblast, Russia. The population was 1,276 as of 2010. There are 11 streets.

== Geography ==
Vostok is located 21 km southeast of Yenotayevka (the district's administrative centre) by road. Kosika is the nearest rural locality.
