= Vostok Subglacial Highlands =

Vostok Subglacial Highlands (80°0′S 102°0′E) is a line of subglacial highlands trending NNW-SSE and forming an east extension of Gamburtsev Subglacial Mountains. The feature was delineated by the Scott Polar Research Institute (SPRI)-National Science Foundation (NSF)-Technical University of Denmark (TUD) airborne radio echo sounding program, 1967–79, and named after Vostok, the flagship of the First Russian Antarctic Expedition, 1819-21 led by Fabian Gottlieb von Bellingshausen.
