= Uschod =

Minsk Metro station

Uschod Усход
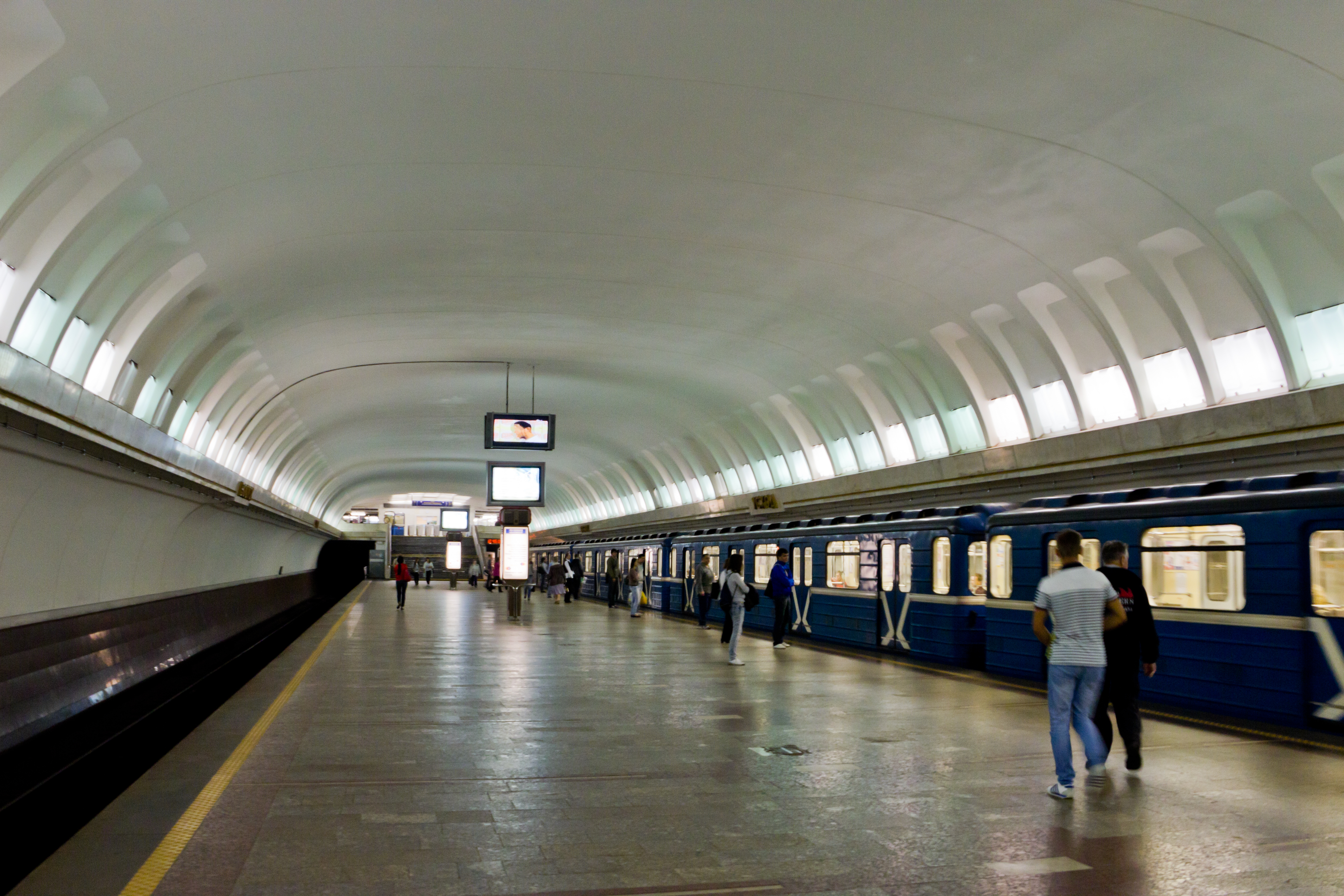
- Station Hall

General information
- Coordinates: 53°56′4″N 27°39′3″E
- System: Minsk Metro
- Owner: Minsk Metro
- Line: Maskoŭskaja line
- Platforms: 1 island platform
- Tracks: 2

Construction
- Structure type: Underground

Other information
- Station code: 122

History
- Opened: 30 December 1986; 39 years ago

Services
Preceding station	Minsk Metro	Following station
Barysaŭski trakt towards Uručča	Maskoŭskaja line	Maskoŭskaja towards Malinawka
Location
- Location within Belarus

Uschod (Belarusian: Усход; Russian: Восток [vɐˈstok], lit. 'East') is a Minsk Metro station in Belarus. It was opened on 30 December 1986.

The station's name not only implies its geographical location, as it was the easternmost station of Minsk Metro for more than 20 years, but also its connotation with the Vostok space programme that ultimately led to the first crewed spaceflight. The station's architectural ensemble (Ye.Leonovich, V.Matelsky) is based on the latter and consists of a single vault shape with a suspended canopy that forms a single element. The canopy simultaneously acts as a blind from the lamps, and also contains the lighting elements which are focused on the apex of the white vault. This "petal" layout is reminiscent of the interior of a spaceship with illuminator windows: contrasting with that is the dark red and grey granite on the walls and the floor.

The station is located near the National Library of Belarus and the residential microrayon Uschod-1 and -2. Its two underground vestibules are interlinked with subways that are located on both sides of the Independence Avenue. From 1986-2007 the station was the terminus of the line and it received quite a lot of passenger traffic from commuters that traveled from the northeast. However, this ended when in 2007 the extension to Barysawski Trakt and Uruchcha was finished.

== Gallery ==
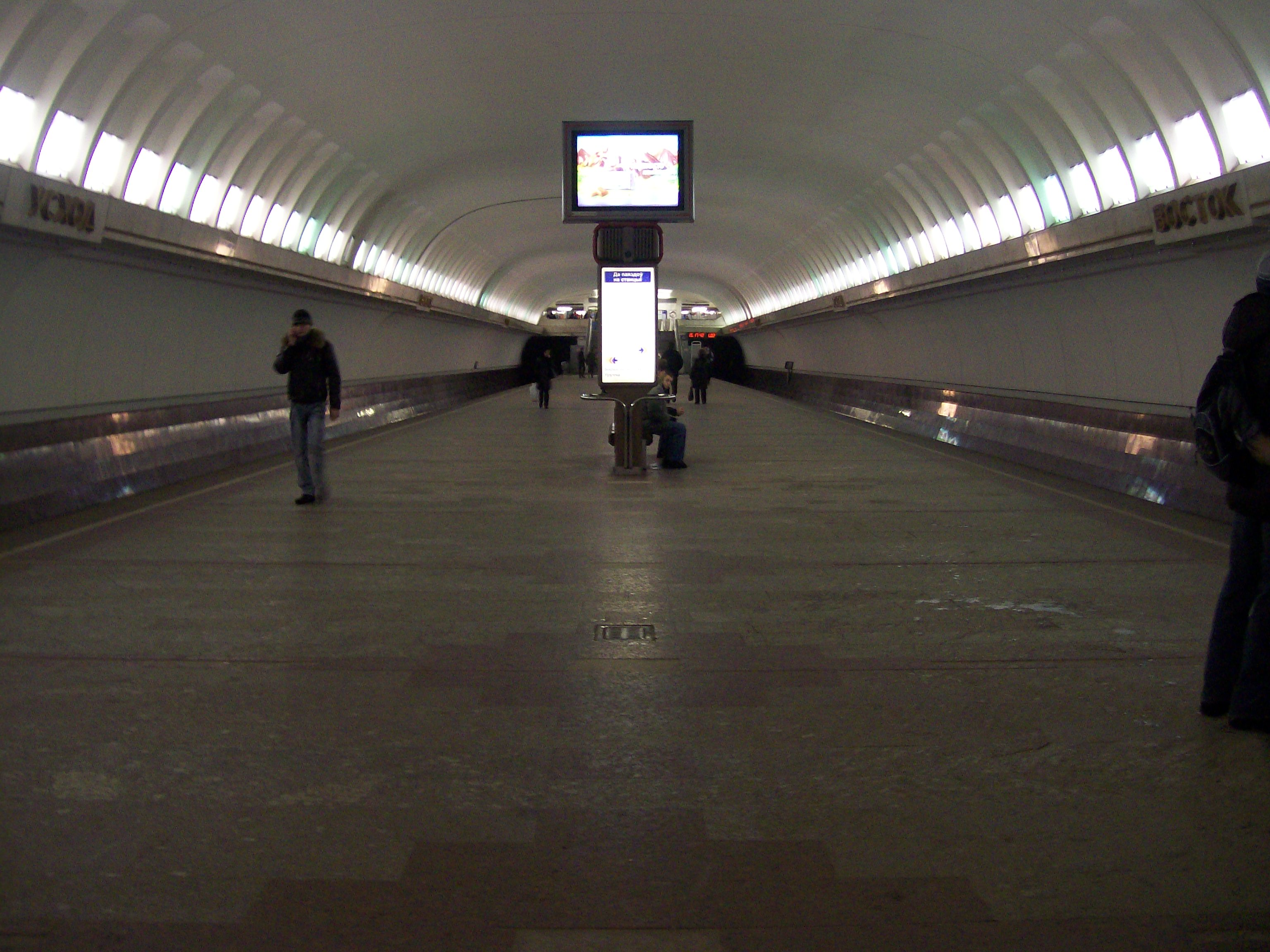

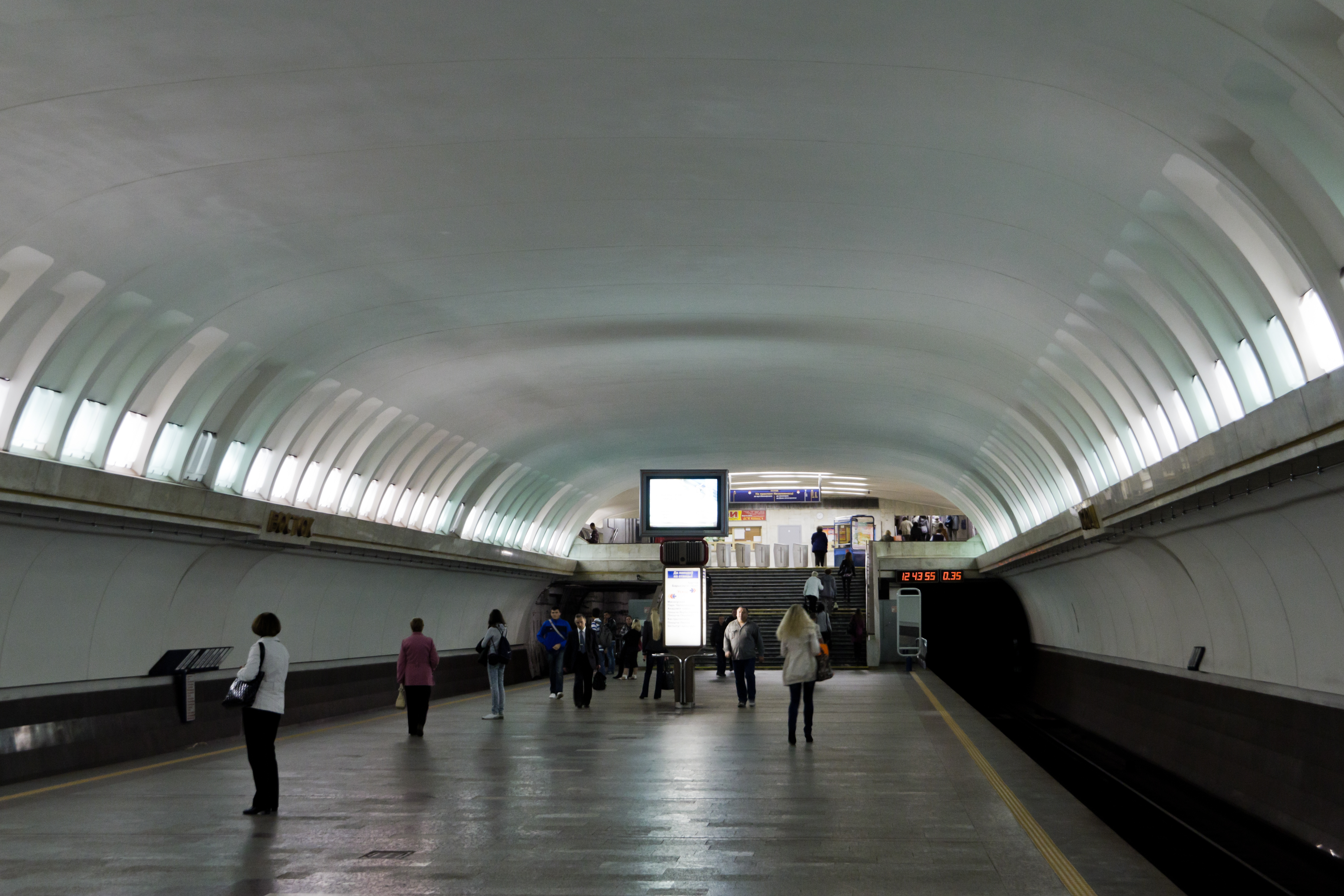

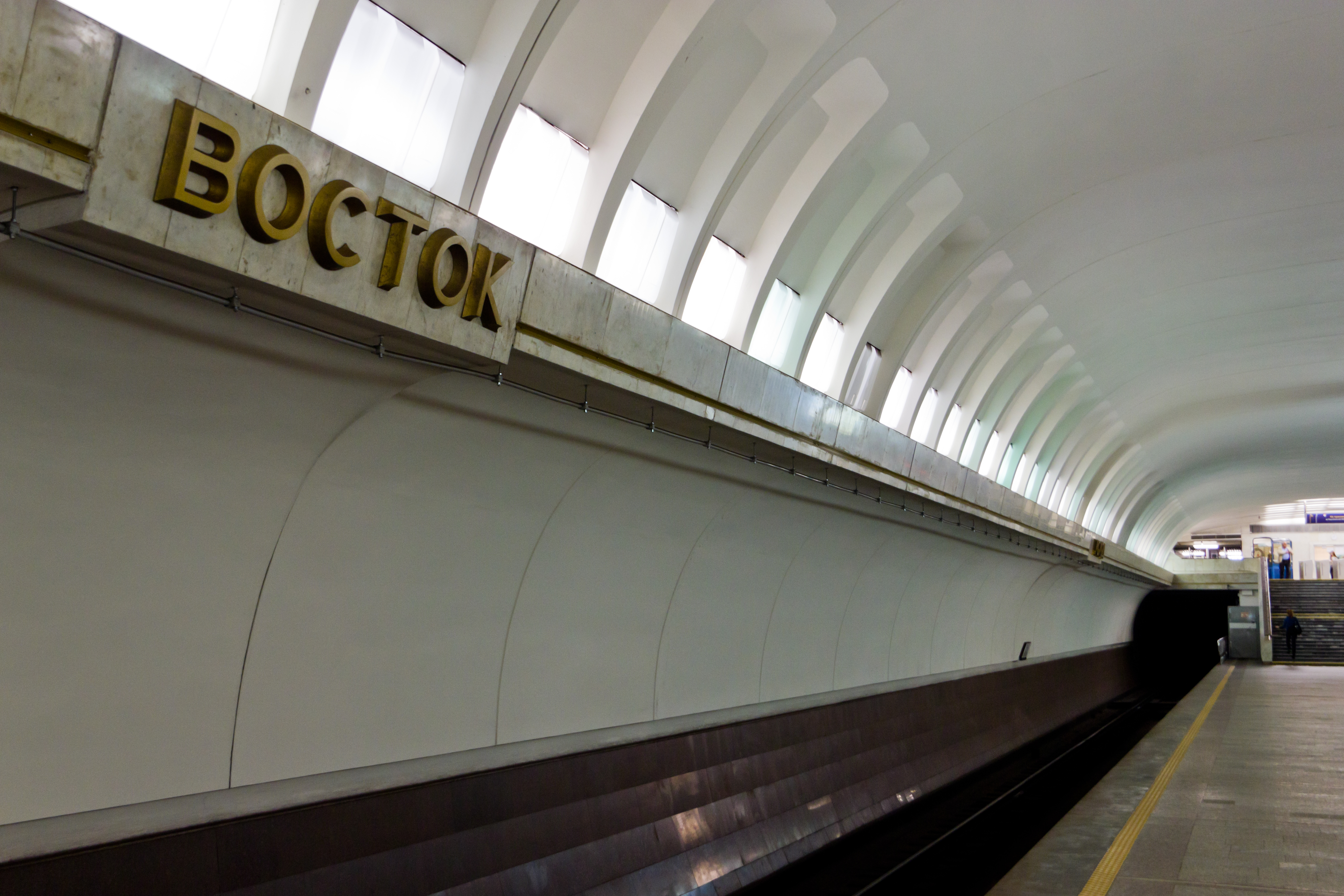

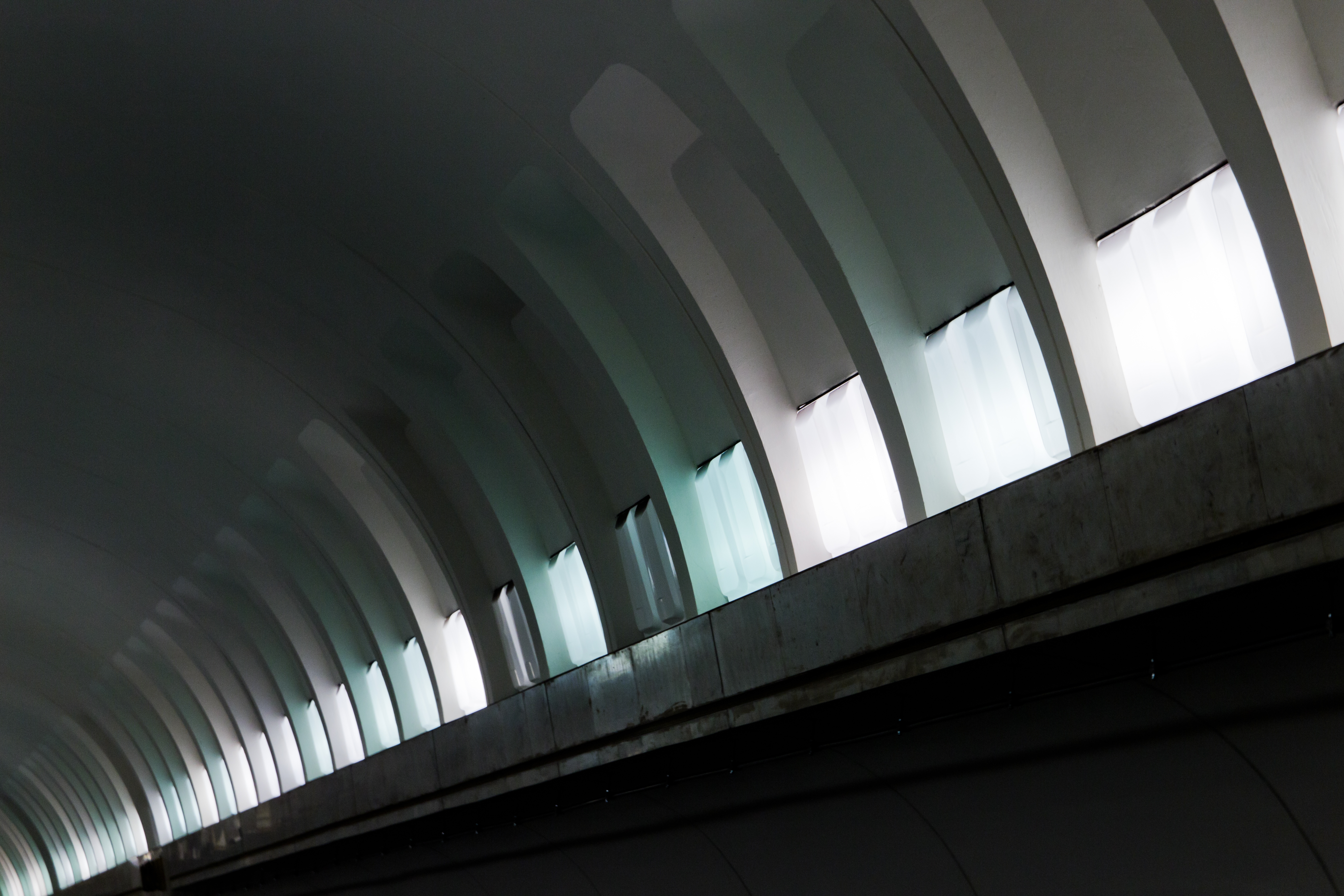

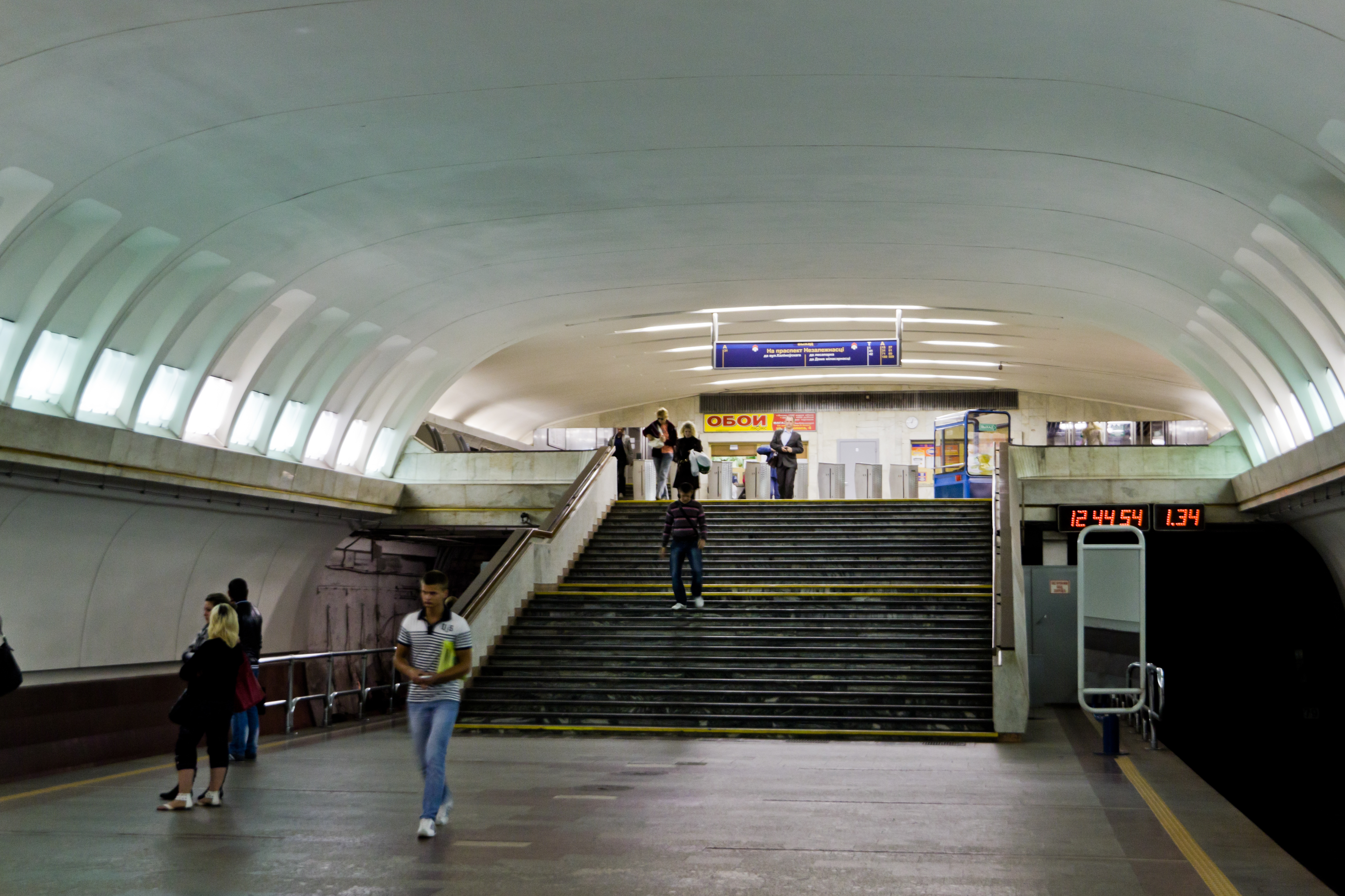

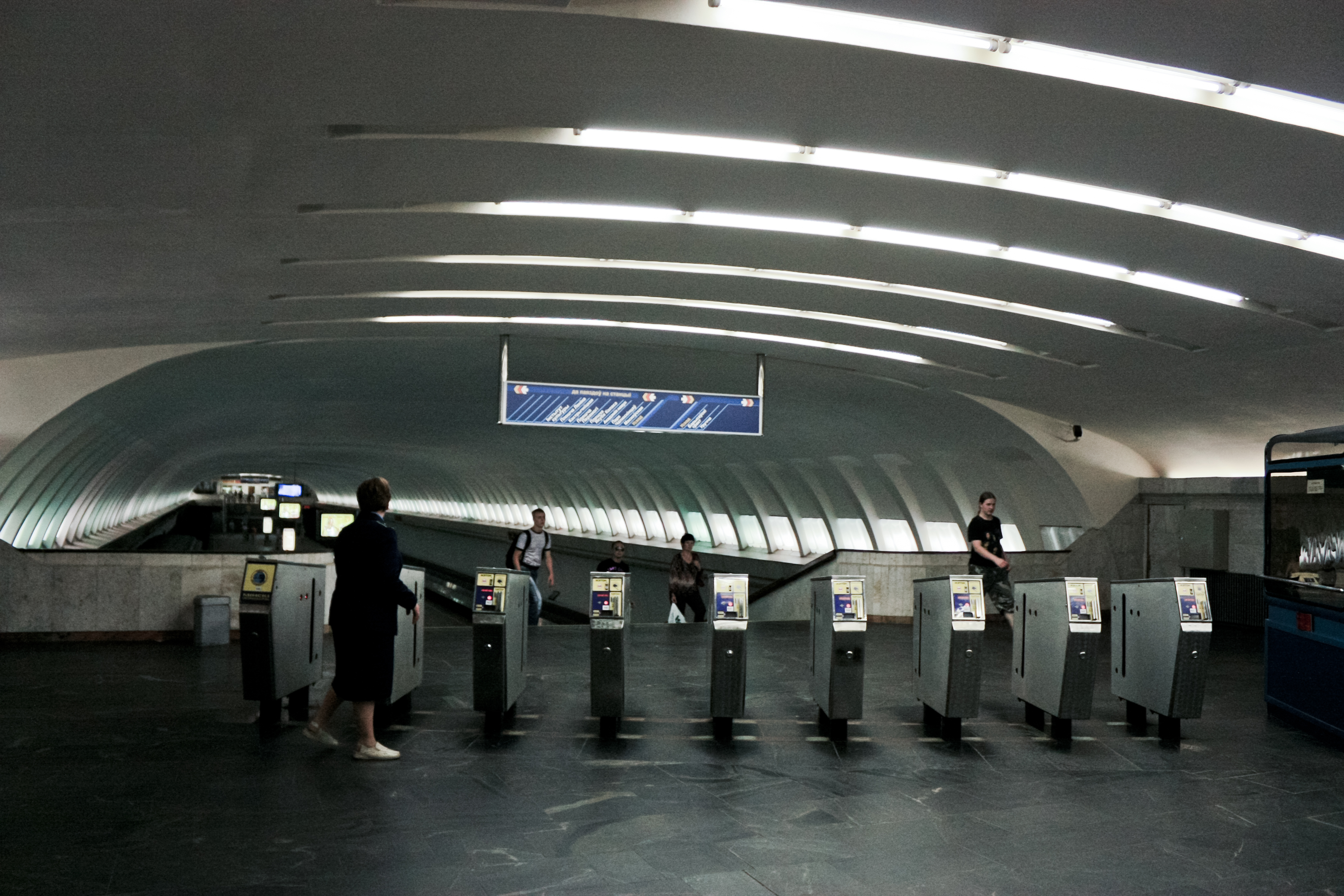

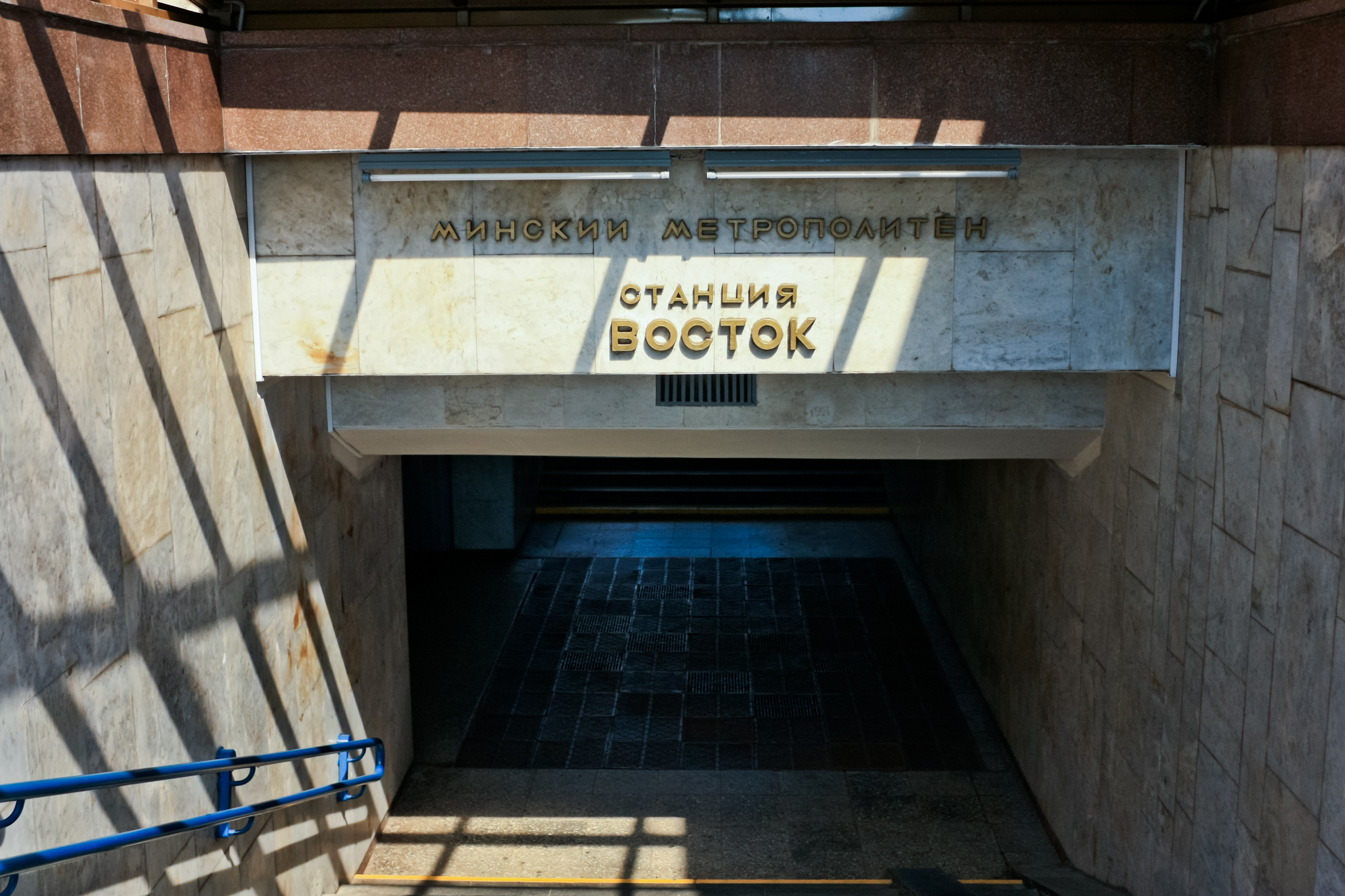

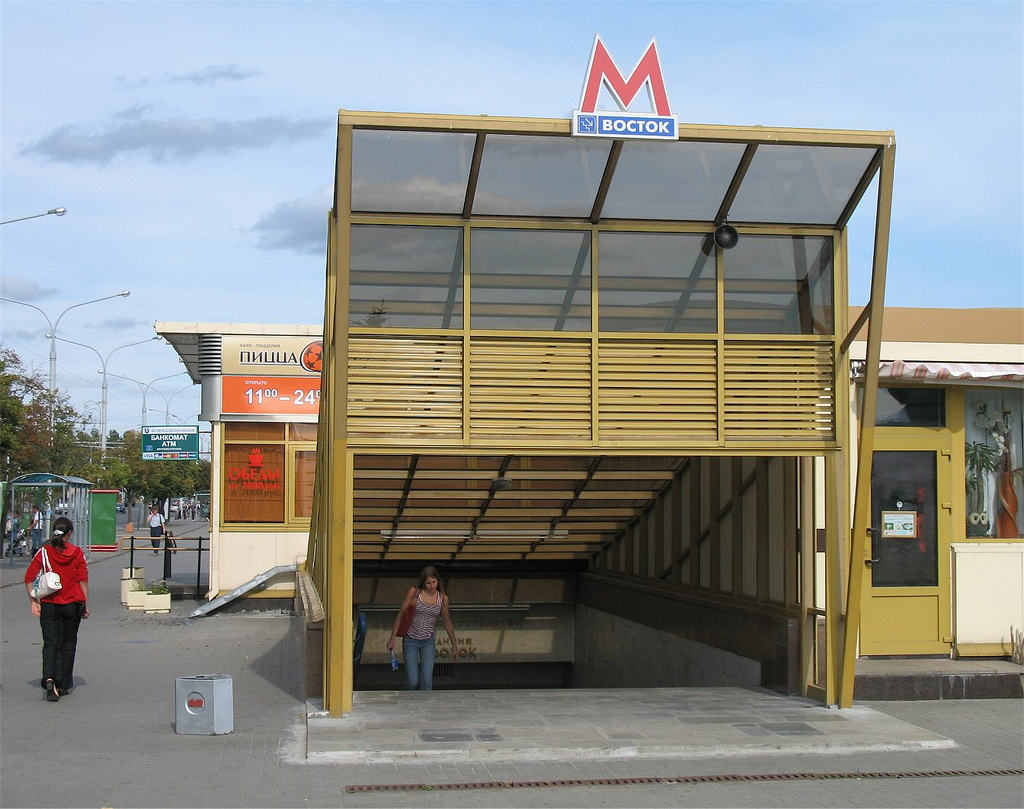
