= Gamburtsev Mountain Range =

Subglacial mountain range located in East Antarctica

Highest point
- Elevation: 3,400 m (11,200 ft)
- Coordinates: 80°30′S 76°00′E

Dimensions
- Length: 1,200 km (750 mi)

Geography
- Continent: Antarctica
- Region: East Antarctica

The Gamburtsev Mountain Range (also known as the Gamburtsev Subglacial Mountains) is a subglacial mountain range located in East Antarctica, just underneath the lofty Dome A, near the Southern Pole of Inaccessibility. The range was discovered by the 3rd Soviet Antarctic Expedition in 1958 and is named for Soviet geophysicist Grigoriy A. Gamburtsev. It is approximately 1,200 kilometres (750 mi) long, and the mountains are believed to be about 2,700 metres (8,900 ft) high, although they are completely covered by over 600 metres (2,000 ft) of ice and snow. The Gamburtsev Mountain Range is about the same size as the European Alps. As of 2008, it was unknown how the mountains were formed due to the lack of data. Studies conducted during the International Polar year demonstrated that ancient plate collisions produced a core that was rejuvenated in the early to mid-Mesozoic . The main features of the range formed before 34 million years ago, when the area was covered by the present ice sheet. Current models suggest that the East Antarctic ice sheet was formed from the glaciers that began sliding down the Gamburtsev range at the end of the Eocene. Vostok Subglacial Highlands form an east extension of Gamburtsev Subglacial Mountains.

Gamburtsev Mountain Range in Antarctica

As part of the 2007–09 International Polar Year, so called, the AGAP project was a multinational effort to gather information about the Gamburtsev mountain chain.

== Completion ==
Scientists announced the completion of their mission on 25 February 2009. Modern-day remote-sensing technology revealed a very jagged landscape. The gathered data will be analysed by researchers in the following months. Dr Fausto Ferraccioli from the British Antarctic Survey said: "We can confirm they are there; we've seen them under the ice. Not only are they similar in dimension to the European Alps, but they are also similar in aspect: we see very sharp peaks and valleys which are remarkably similar to the Alps themselves. It all adds to the mystery – from the tectonic perspective of how these mountains were created; and from the glacial history perspective of how the East Antarctic ice sheet was formed and didn't erode these peaks."

The AGAP project comprised scientists, engineers, pilots and support staff from Australia, Canada, China, Germany, Japan, the United Kingdom, and the United States. Two field camps were established deep within the Antarctic interior and aircraft flew across the ice, mapping the shape of the sub-glacials using an ice-penetrating radar. The local gravitational and magnetic fields were also measured. 120,000 km were flown, with over 20% of the East Antarctic Ice Sheet being explored during the course of the mission.

Information was recorded on a network of seismometers that picked up earthquake signals passing through the rock from the opposite side of the planet. Despite the extreme temperatures — around −30 °C at the two base camps as reported by AGAP US co-leader Dr Robin Bell — liquid water was detected in the valleys three kilometres beneath the team. Ferraccioli added: "Up until now we just had an ambitious plan. Now we have all this remarkable data to pore over."

By December, 2009, data analyzed so far from the AGAP project indicate the mountain range is generally oriented southwest to northeast, and arose from tectonic plate activity.

The team's next goal is to drill through the ice and collect the first Gamburtsev rock samples. "Amazingly, we have samples of the moon but none of the Gamburtsevs," said Robin Bell, a geophysicist at Columbia University's Lamont–Doherty Earth Observatory. "With these rock samples we will be able to constrain when this ancient piece of crust was rejuvenated and grew to a magnificent mountain range."

== Origin ==
The result of the 2007–2009 study has found that the Gamburtsev are very old, first forming around a billion years ago when continental drift pushed two plates together to form the super-continent of Rodinia. This early range was eroded above the surface but left a deep cold root, which is visible today in seismic images, reaching down into the Earth's mantle. About 250-100 million years ago, the crust started to pull apart in a series of rifting events close to the east of this old root. A forked rift valley runs along the northern side of the mountains containing lakes Sovetskaya and 90East within it. This rifting warmed and rejuvenated the root, giving it the buoyancy to be lifted up to re-establish the mountains as an 800 km long massif. Further uplift still was achieved as deep valleys were later cut erosion lightening the overall mass of the system. Around 35 million years ago, the glaciers merged to form the East Antarctic Ice Sheet, burying the Gamburtsev Range in the process.
