= Chaikovskij (crater) =

Crater on Mercury

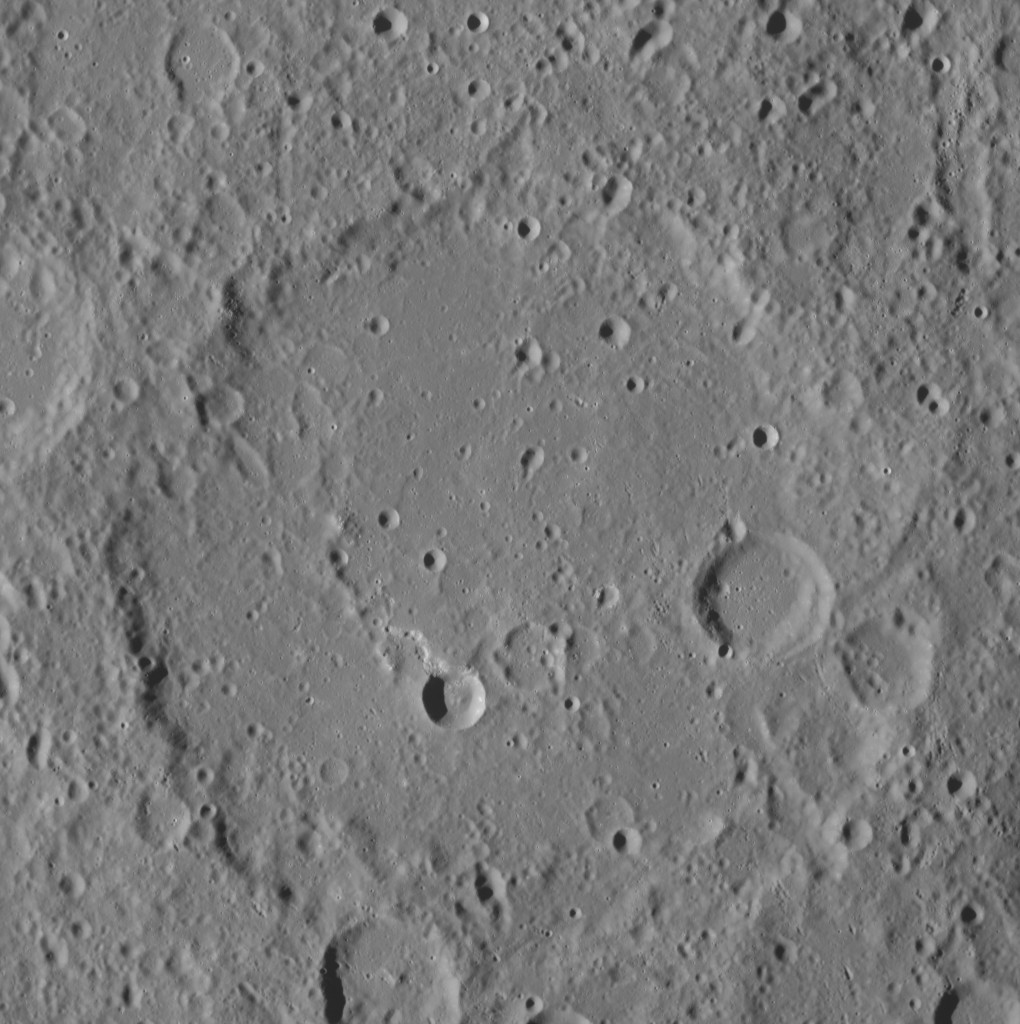
- MESSENGER WAC imagery of Chaikovskij
- Feature type: Impact crater
- Location: Kuiper quadrangle, Mercury
- Coordinates: 7.4°N 50.4°W
- Diameter: 171 km (106 mi)
- Eponym: Pyotr Ilyich Tchaikovsky

Chaikovskij (sometimes Tchaikovsky) is a crater on Mercury. It has a diameter of 171 kilometers. Its name was adopted by the International Astronomical Union (IAU) in 1976. Chaikovskij is named for the Russian composer Pyotr Ilyich Tchaikovsky, who lived from 1840 to 1893.

Veronese and Mistral craters are to the southwest of Chaikovskij. Giotto is to the northwest, and Lermontov is to the north. Haystack Catena is to the southeast.

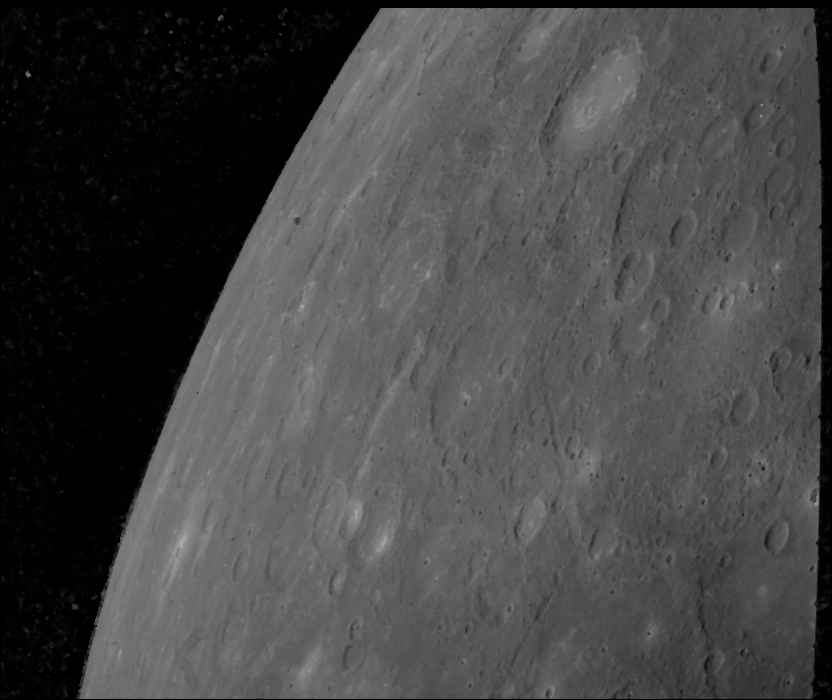
Mariner 10 image with Chaikovskij near center

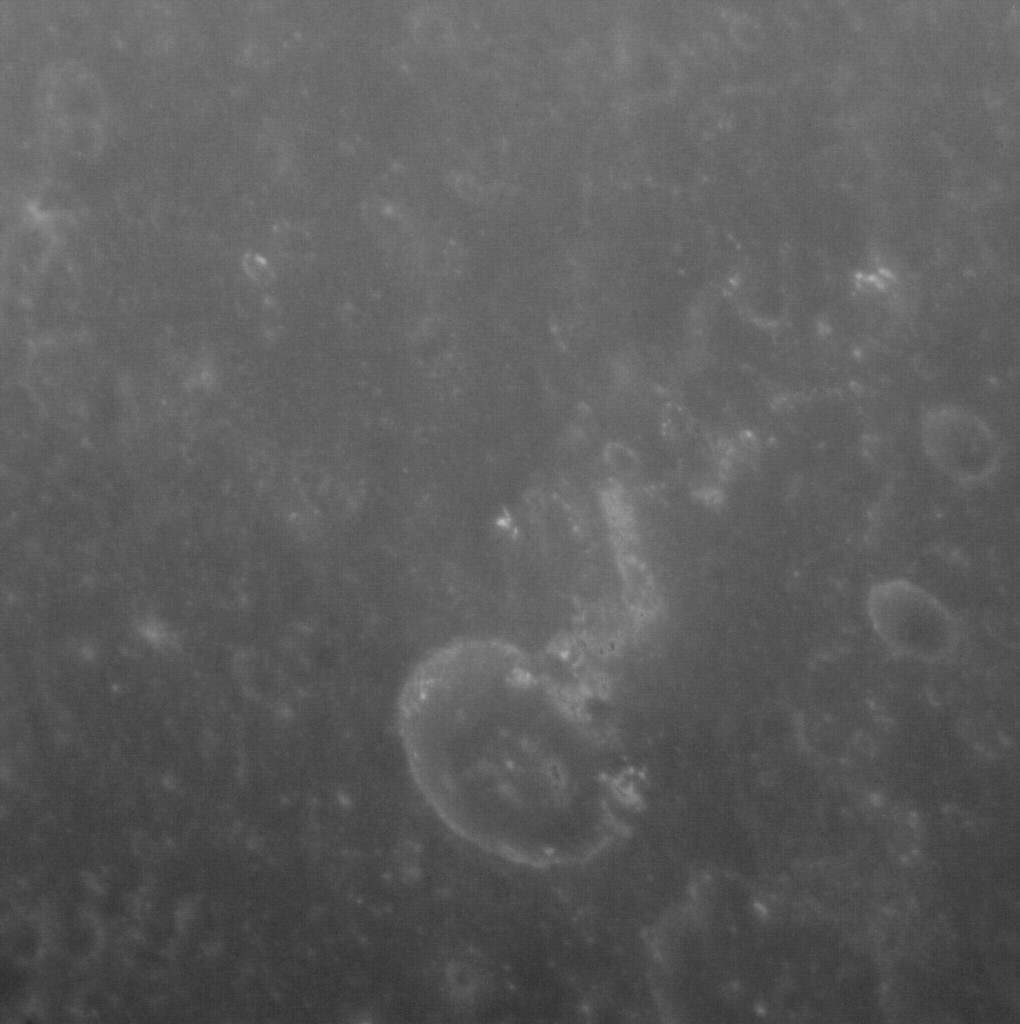
Chaikovskij crater interior, with a bright scarp and possible hollows
