= Truffaut (surname) =

Truffaut is a French surname that may refer to

- François Truffaut (1932–1984), French film director, screenwriter, producer, actor and critic
  - François Truffaut Award
  - Bibliothèque du cinéma François-Truffaut, a film library in Paris
  - François Truffaut: Stolen Portraits, a 1993 French documentary film
  - Hitchcock/Truffaut, a 1966 book by François Truffaut about Alfred Hitchcock
  - Hitchcock/Truffaut (film), a 2015 French-American documentary film
  - Rue François-Truffaut, a street in the 12th arrondissement of Paris
  - Truffaut (crater), a crater of Mercury named after François Truffaut
- André Truffaut (born 1953), French footballer
- Éva Truffaut (born 1961), French actress and photographer; daughter of François Truffaut and Madeleine Morgenstern
- France Truffaut (1926–2014), Belgian politician
- Georges Truffaut (1872–1948), French gardener, founder of Jardineries Truffaut
- Georges Truffaut (1901–1942), Belgian politician
- Joanna Truffaut, French Digital transformation advisor and entrepreneur
- Pierre Truffaut (1894–1974), French politician
- Rue Truffaut, a street in the 17th arrondissement of Paris

== See also ==
- Arlette Truffaut or Murmur, a Marvel Comics character
