= Proust (disambiguation) =

Marcel Proust (1871–1922) was a French author.

Proust may also refer to:

== People ==
- Joseph Proust (1754–1826), French chemist, responsible for the Law of definite proportions
- Antonin Proust (1832–1905), French journalist and politician
- Adrien Proust (1834–1903, French epidemiologist and hygienist
- Jean-Paul Proust (1940–2010), minister of state of Monaco
- Christine Proust (born 1953), French historian of mathematics and Assyriologist
- Caroline Proust (born 1967), French actress

== Other uses ==
- Proust (essay), a 1931 essay by Samuel Beckett
- Proust Questionnaire, a personality test
- 4474 Proust, a main-belt asteroid
- Proust (crater), on Mercury

== See also ==
- Prost (disambiguation)
