= Carvalho (crater) =

Crater on Mercury

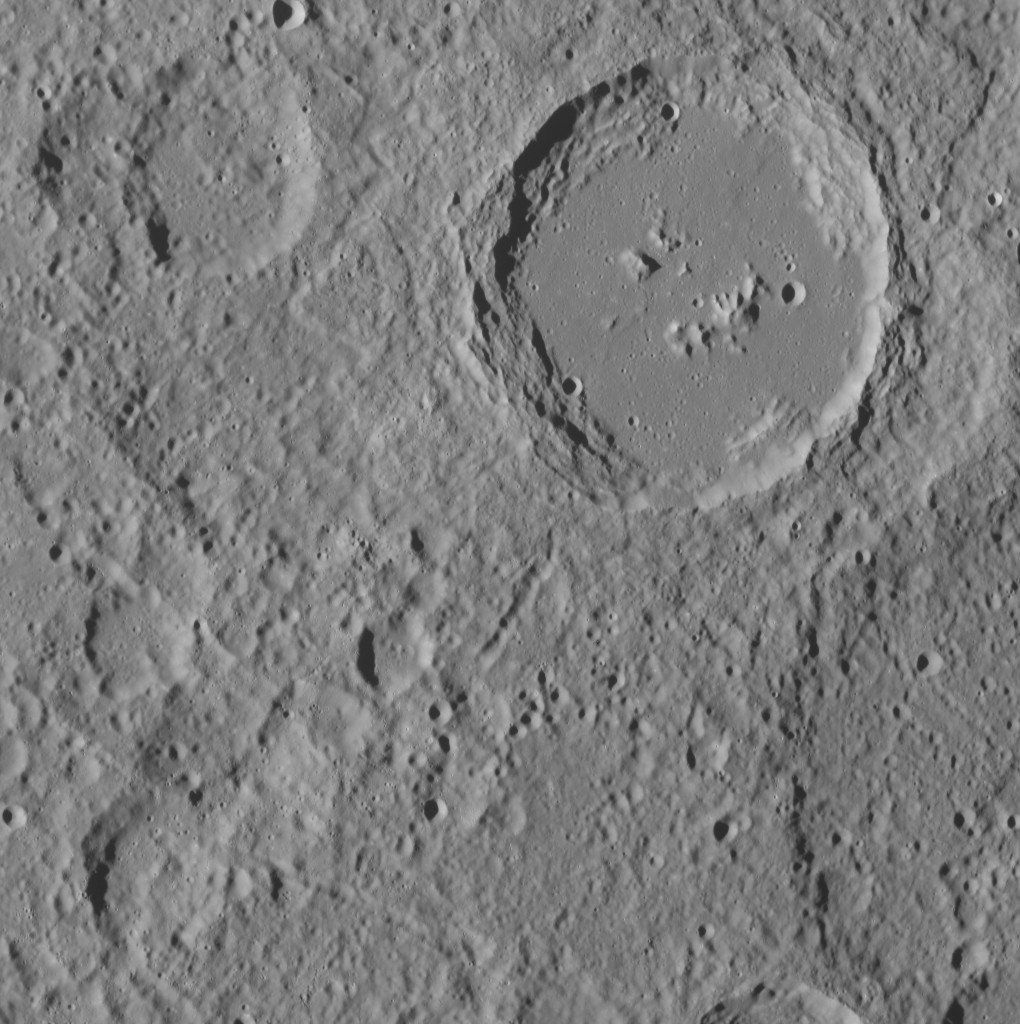
- MESSENGER WAC
- Planet: Mercury
- Coordinates: 26.82°N 51.61°W
- Quadrangle: Victoria
- Diameter: 90 km (56 mi)
- Eponym: Beth Carvalho

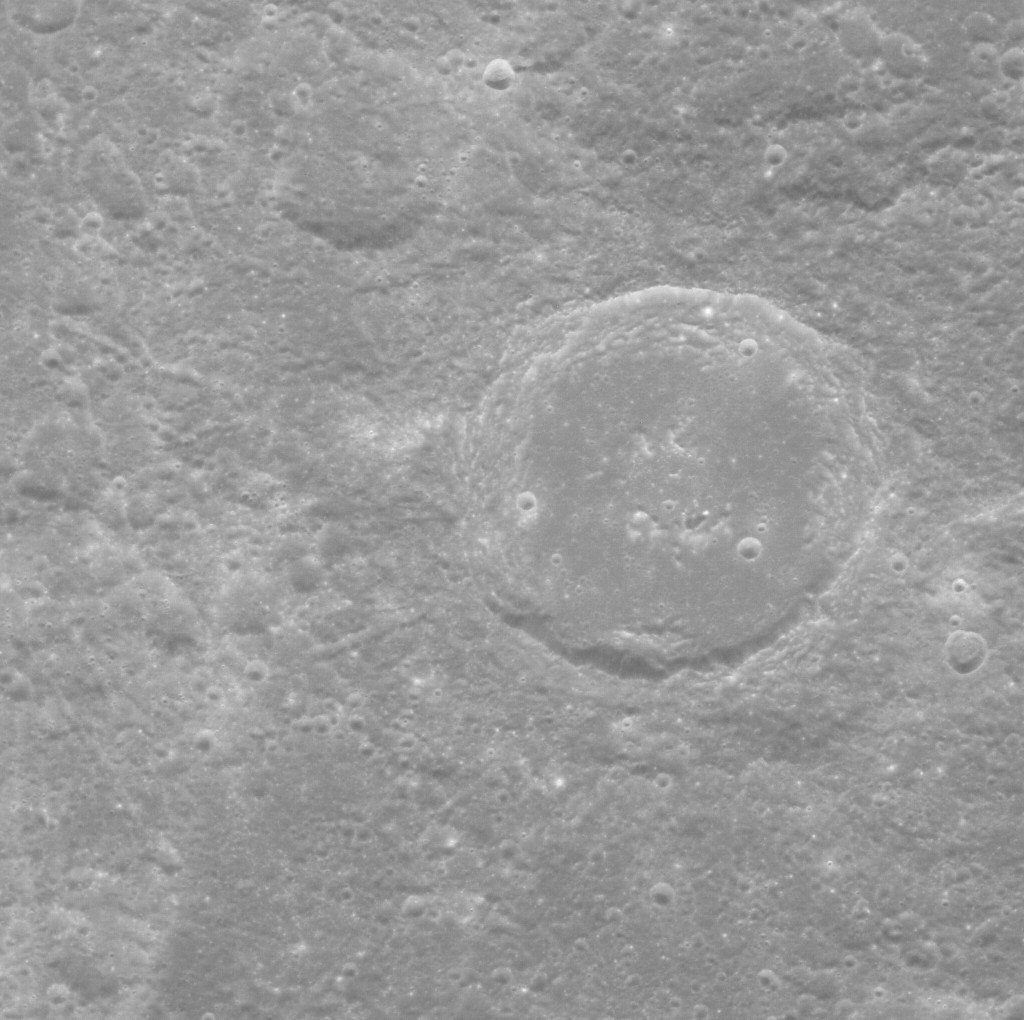
Carvalho at higher sun angle

Carvalho is a crater on Mercury. Its name was adopted by the International Astronomical Union (IAU) on August 13, 2024, for the Brazilian musician Beth Carvalho, who lived from 1946 to 2019. The crater was first imaged by Mariner 10 in 1974.

Carvalho is to the southeast of the ancient crater Kuan Han-Chʻing. It is east of Praxiteles and north of Bek.
