= Kuan Han-Chʻing (crater) =

Crater on Mercury

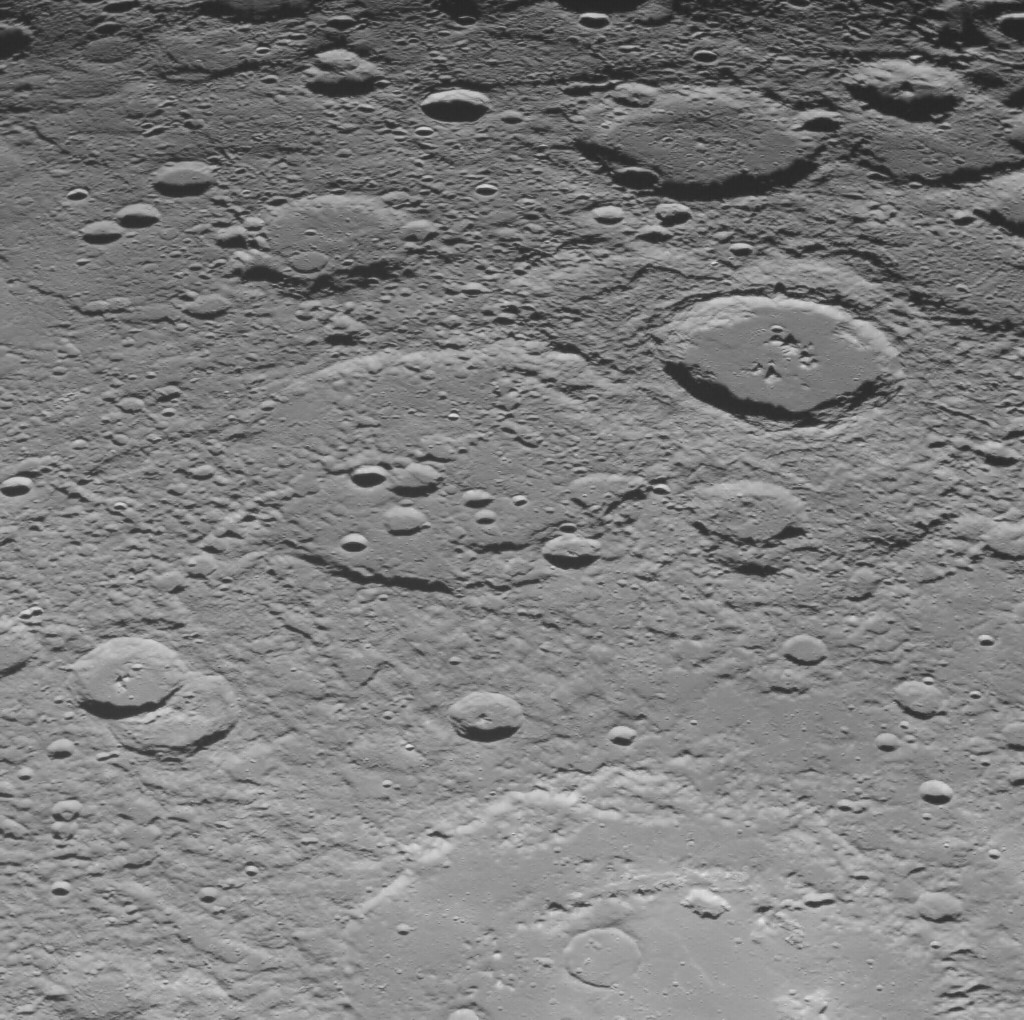
- Oblique view with Kuan Han-Chʽing near center, with Carvalho at right. MESSENGER WAC.
- Feature type: Impact crater
- Location: Victoria quadrangle, Mercury
- Coordinates: 29.44°N 53.67°W
- Diameter: 143.0 km (88.9 mi)
- Eponym: Guan Hanqing

Kuan Han-Chʻing is a crater on Mercury. Its name was adopted by the International Astronomical Union in 1979. Kuan Han-Chʻing is named for the Chinese playwright Guan Hanqing, who lived from 1241 to 1320. The crater was first imaged by Mariner 10 in 1974.

Kuan Han-Chʽing is northeast of the large crater Praxiteles and south of Velázquez crater. Carvalho crater is to the southeast.

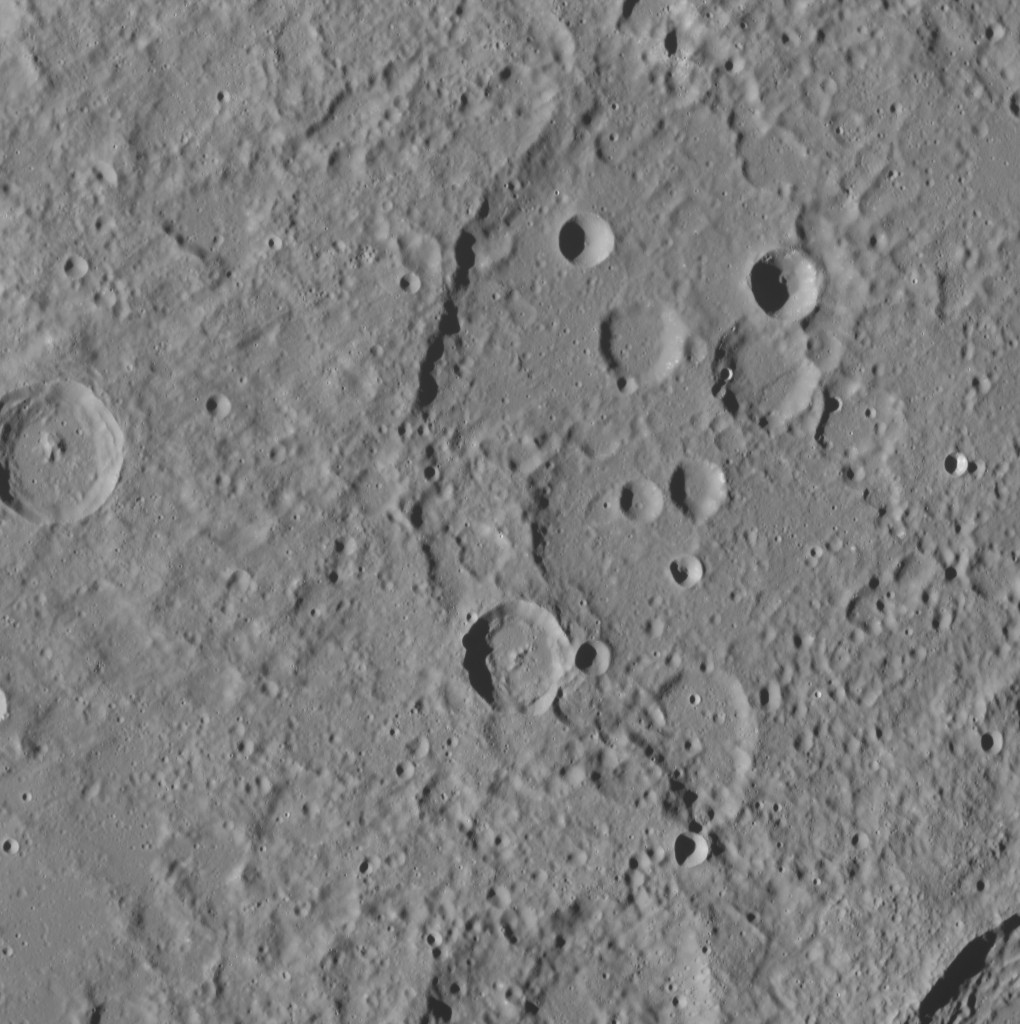
Most of Kuan Han-Chʽing crater (right)

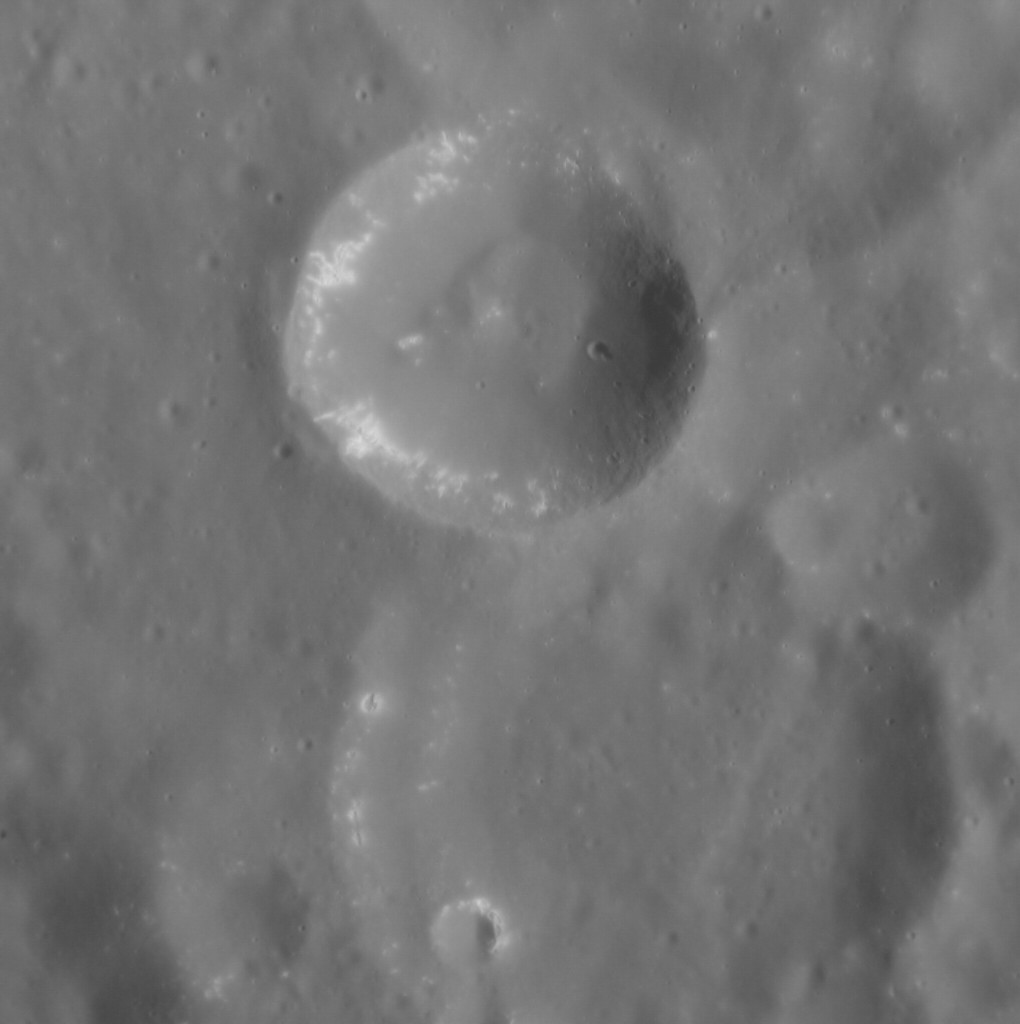
Hollows within a small crater in Kuan Han-Chʽing crater
