= Bek (crater) =

Crater on Mercury

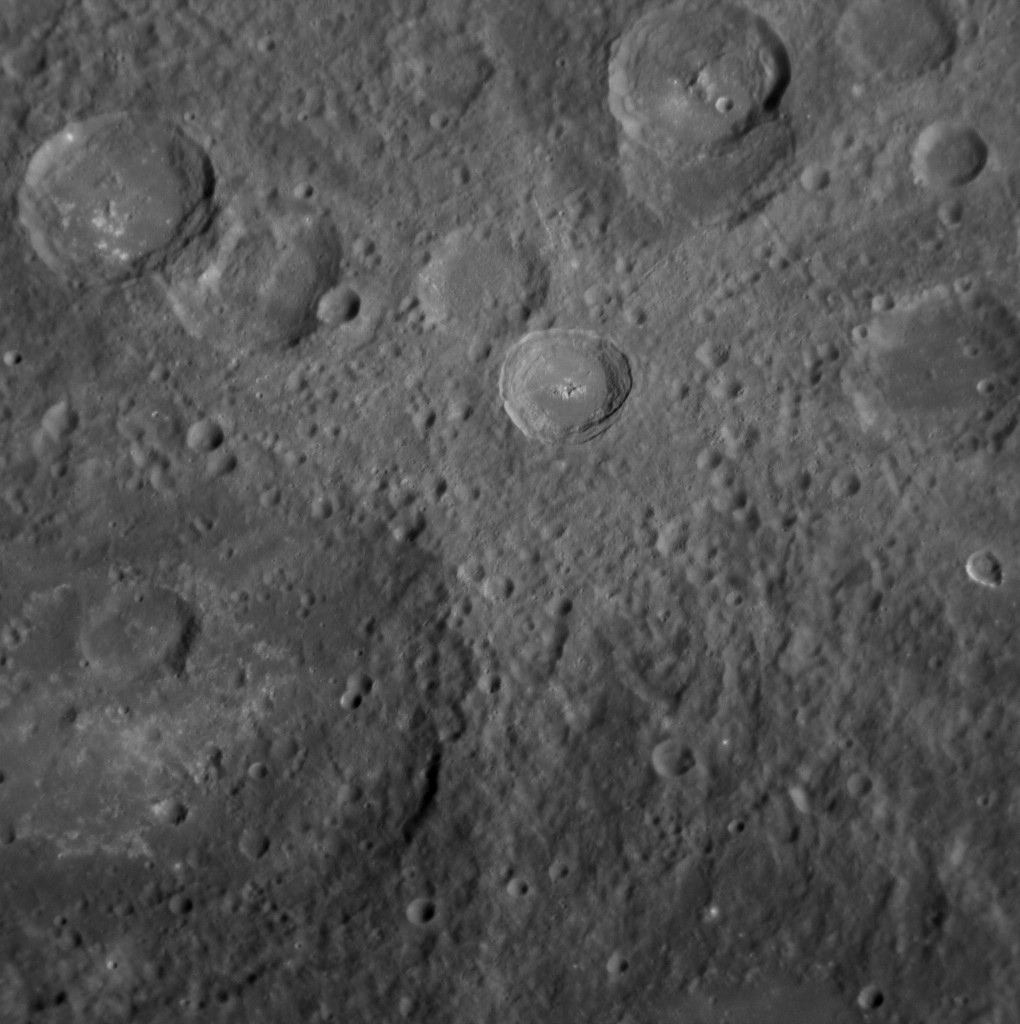
- The first image of Bek by MESSENGER, from second flyby on 6 October 2008
- Feature type: Impact crater
- Location: Victoria quadrangle, Mercury
- Coordinates: 21.16°N 50.99°W
- Diameter: 32 km (20 mi)
- Eponym: Bek

Bek is a crater on Mercury. It has a diameter of 32 kilometers. Its name was adopted by the International Astronomical Union (IAU) on 3 March 2010. Bek is named for the Egyptian sculptor Bek, who lived in the 14th century BCE.

Bek is north of Lermontov crater, and south of Carvalho.

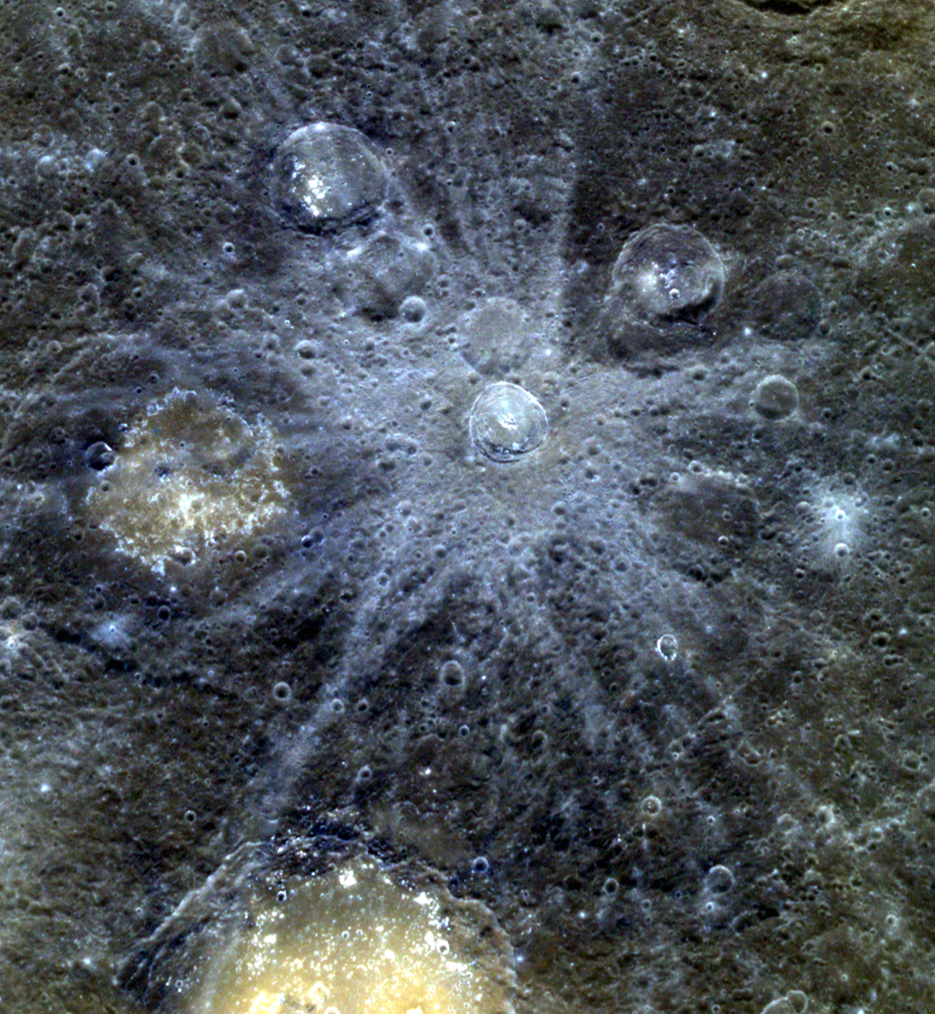
Bek crater in approximate color, with its prominent bluish rays

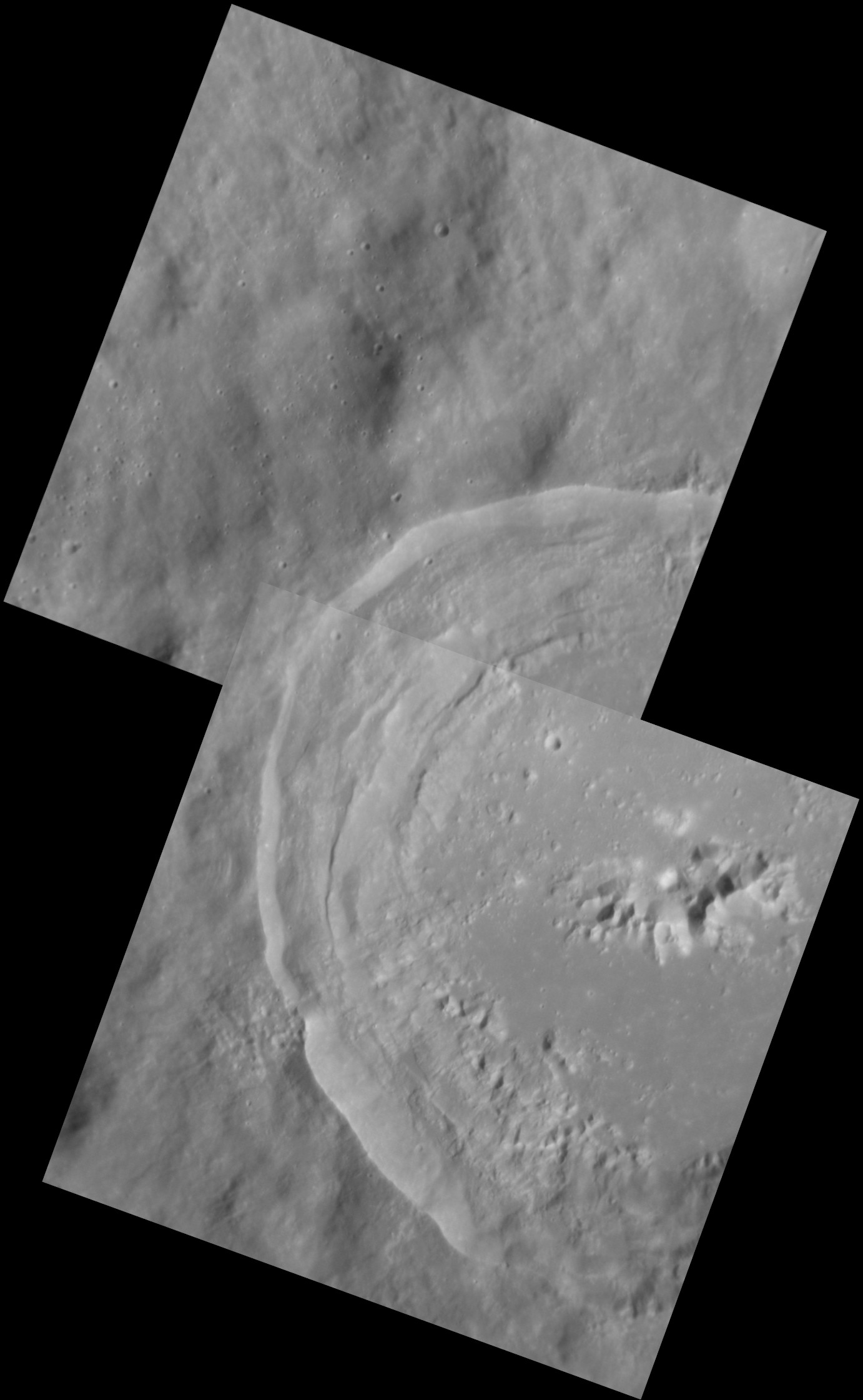
Highest resolution images of Bek obtained by MESSENGER
