= Giotto (disambiguation) =

Giotto, full name Giotto di Bondone (1267–1337) is an Italian painter.

Giotto may also refer to:

- Giotto's Campanile, Florence
- Giotto Bizzarrini (1926–2023), Italian automobile engineer
- Giotto Griffiths (1864–1938), Welsh rugby player
- Giotto (spacecraft), a European Space Agency probe that observed Halley's comet
- Ferrero Giotto, a brand of round wafer-based snacks
- Giotto, a Linux bootable floppy disk
- Giotto (work-place integrity test), a psychological test for employers to assess personal integrity
- Giotto, a fictional character in the manga and anime series Katekyō Hitman Reborn!
- 7367 Giotto, a main-belt asteroid
- Giotto (crater), a crater on Mercury
