= Giotto (crater) =

Crater on Mercury

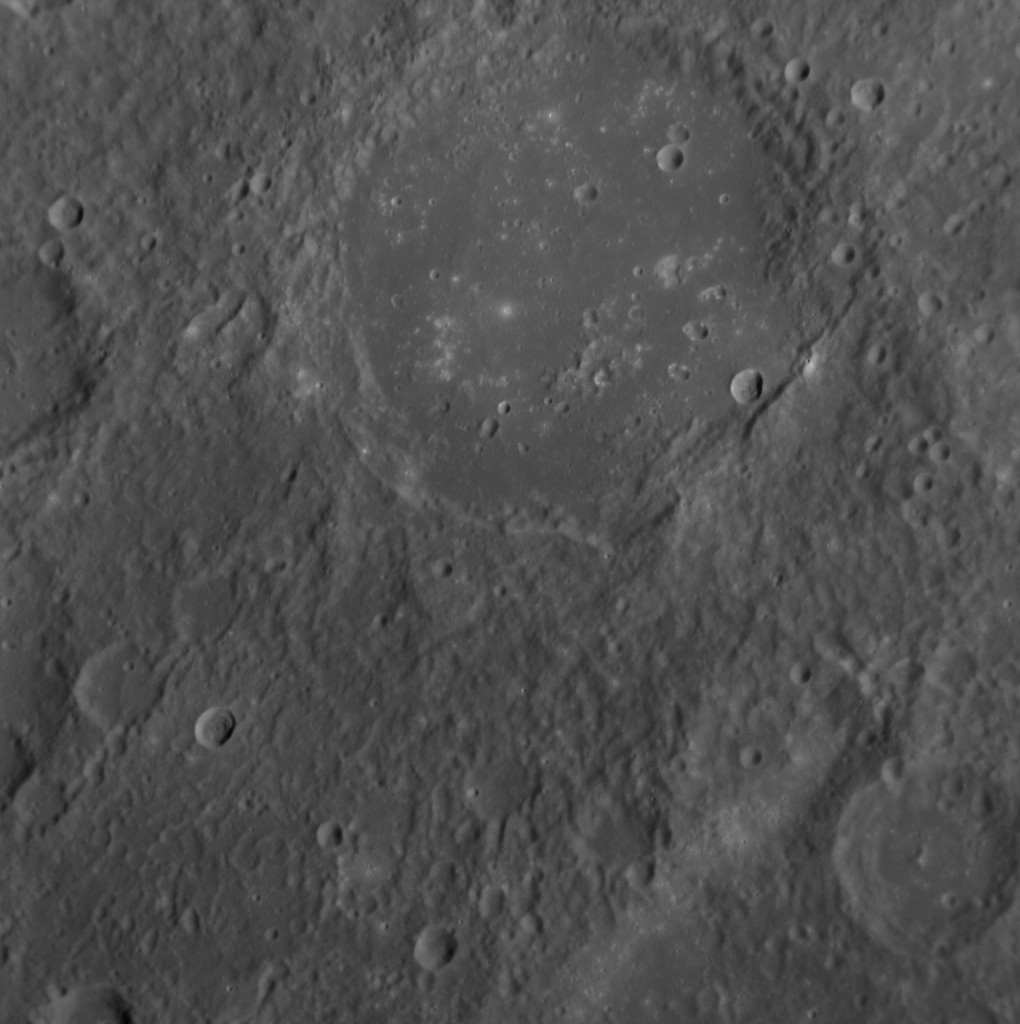
- MESSENGER NAC image from its second flyby in October 2008
- Feature type: Impact crater
- Location: Kuiper quadrangle, Mercury
- Coordinates: 12.46°N 56.48°W
- Diameter: 144 km (89 mi)
- Eponym: Giotto di Bondone

Giotto is a crater on Mercury. It has a diameter of 144 kilometers. Its name was adopted by the International Astronomical Union (IAU) in 1976. Giotto is named for the Italian painter Giotto di Bondone, who lived from 1267 to 1337.

Hollows are scattered across the floor of Giotto.

Lermontov crater is to the northeast of Giotto. Chaikovskij is to the southeast. Veronese and Mistral are to the south. Truffaut is to the east.

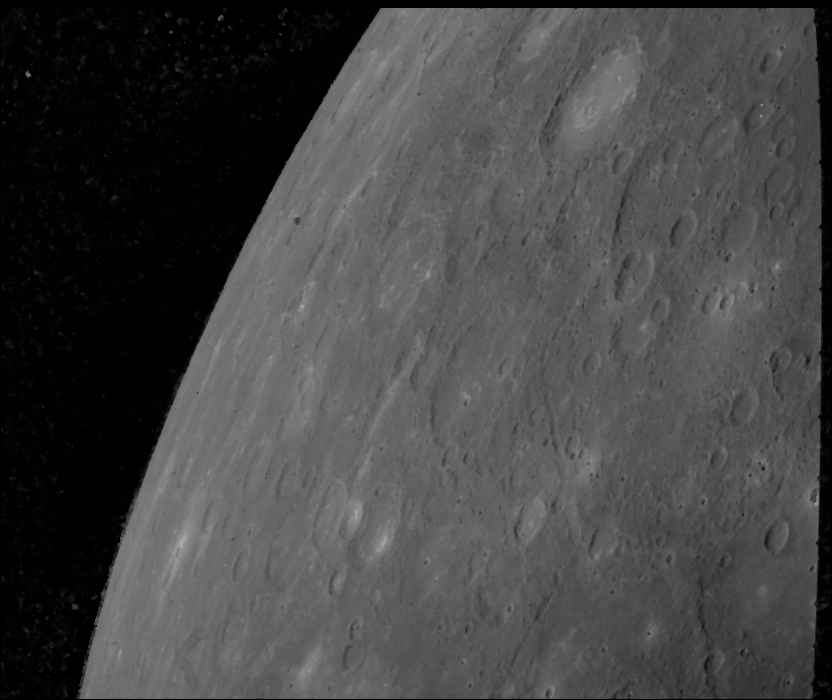
Mariner 10 image with Giotto near center

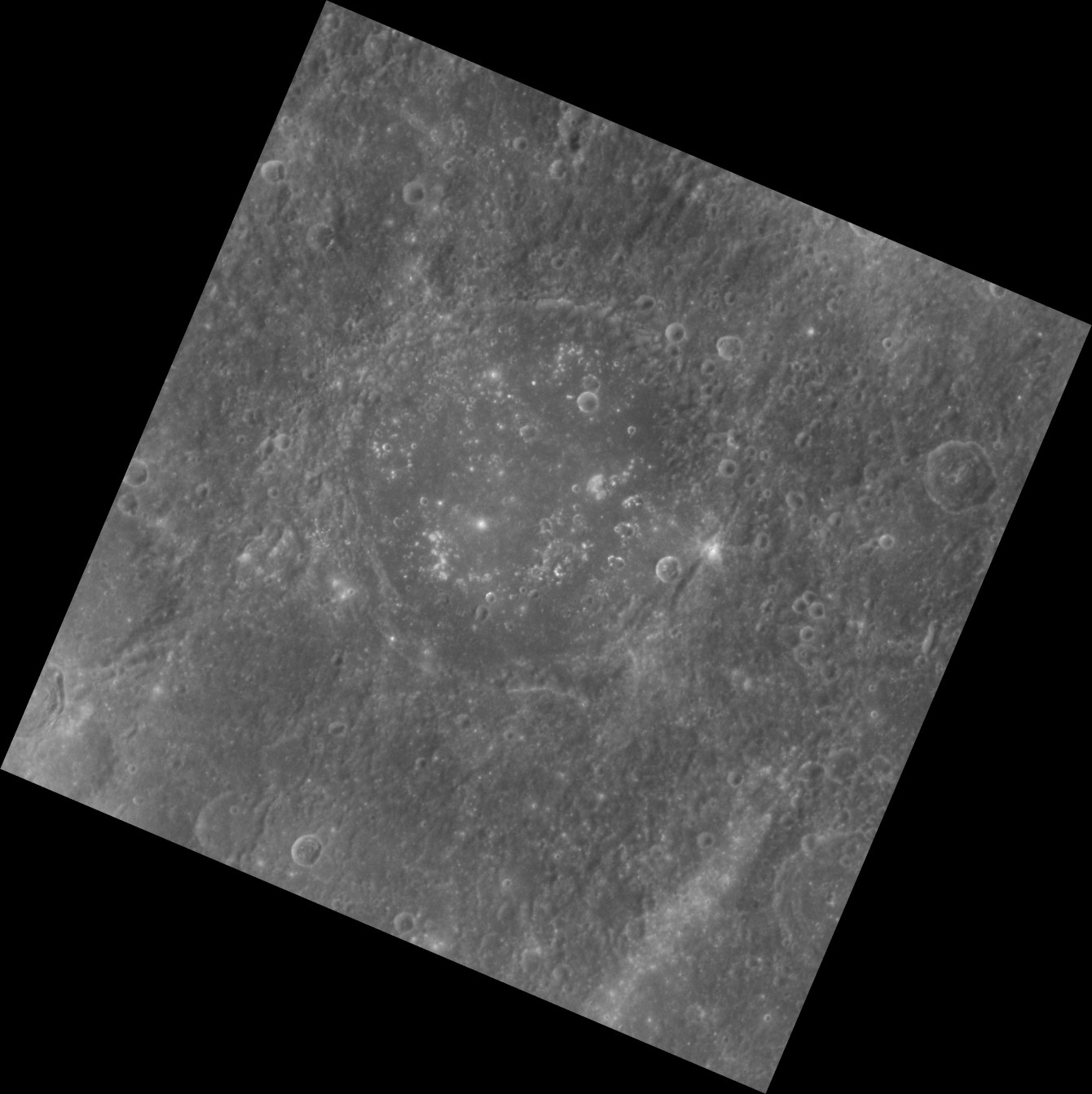
Giotto crater at a high sun angle

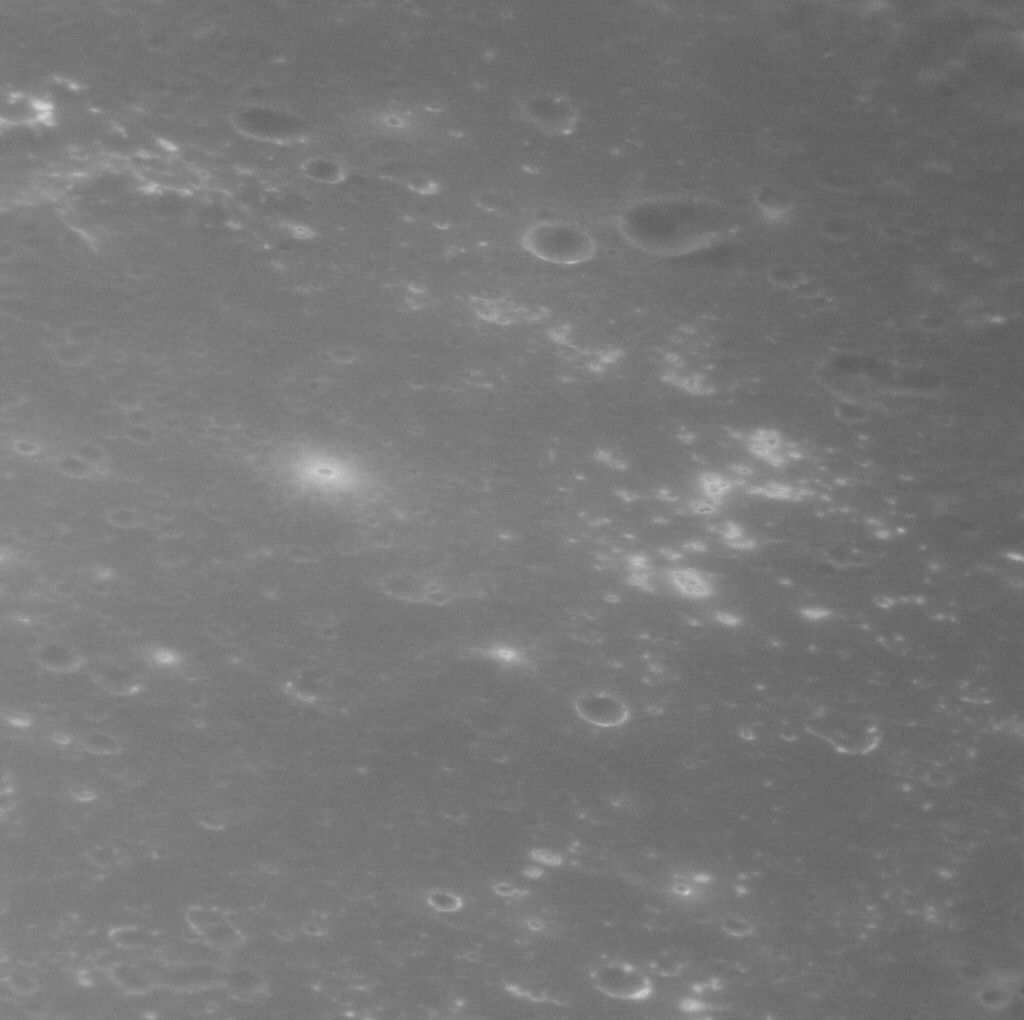
Oblique view of part of the crater floor, showing hollows

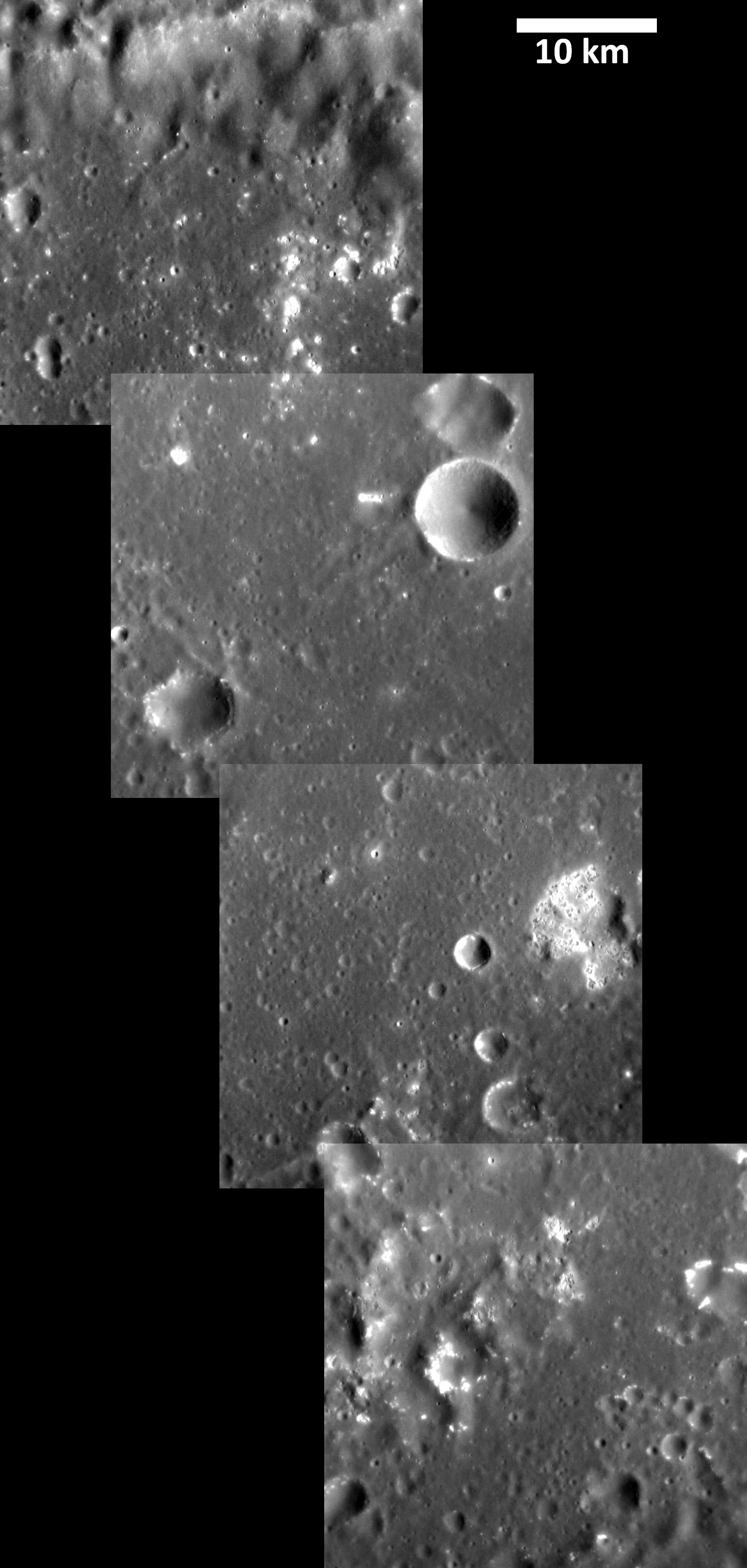
Detail of the crater floor showing hollows.
