= Veronese (crater) =

Crater on Mercury

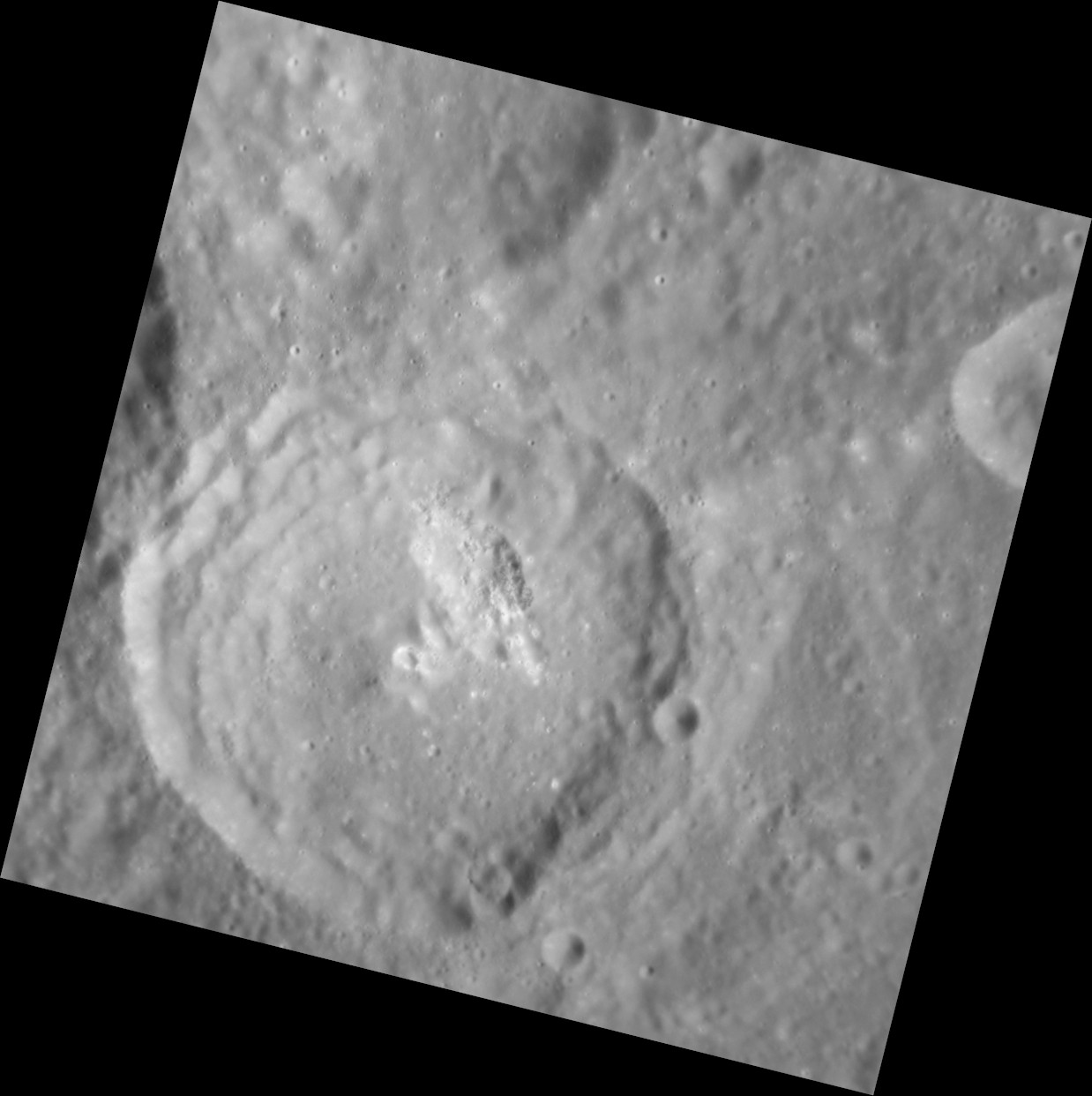
- MESSENGER NAC
- Planet: Mercury
- Coordinates: 5.3°N 55.95°W
- Quadrangle: Kuiper
- Diameter: 45 km (28 mi)
- Eponym: Paolo Veronese

Veronese is a crater on Mercury. It has a diameter of 45 kilometres (28 miles). Its name was adopted by the International Astronomical Union (IAU) on June 28, 2021. Veronese is named for the Italian painter Paolo Veronese.

Vereonese contains a large irregular depression in its floor. The depression is bright and probably contains hollows. Similar depressions are present within nearby Mistral crater. The depressions are similar to those within Navoi, Lermontov, Scarlatti, and Praxiteles. The depressions are thought to be caused by volcanic explosions.

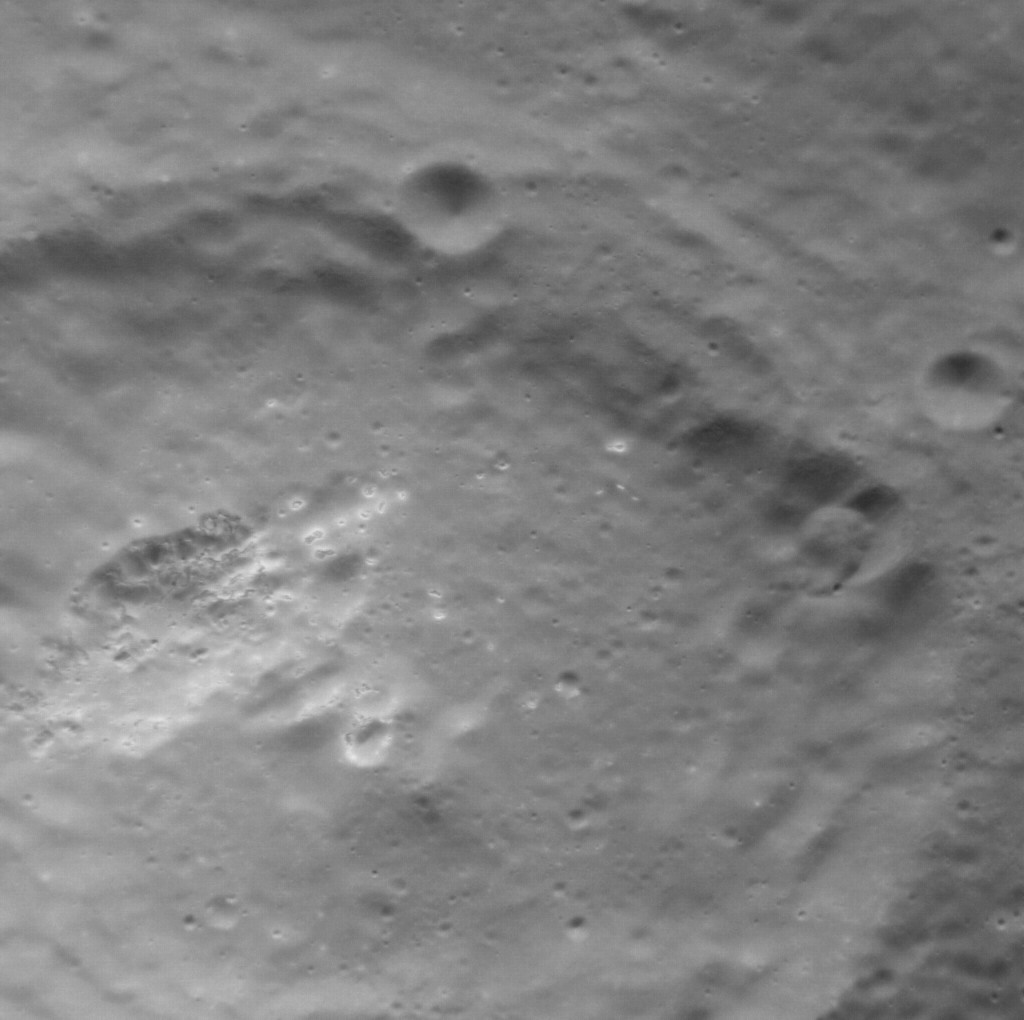
Oblique view showing detail of the irregular pit

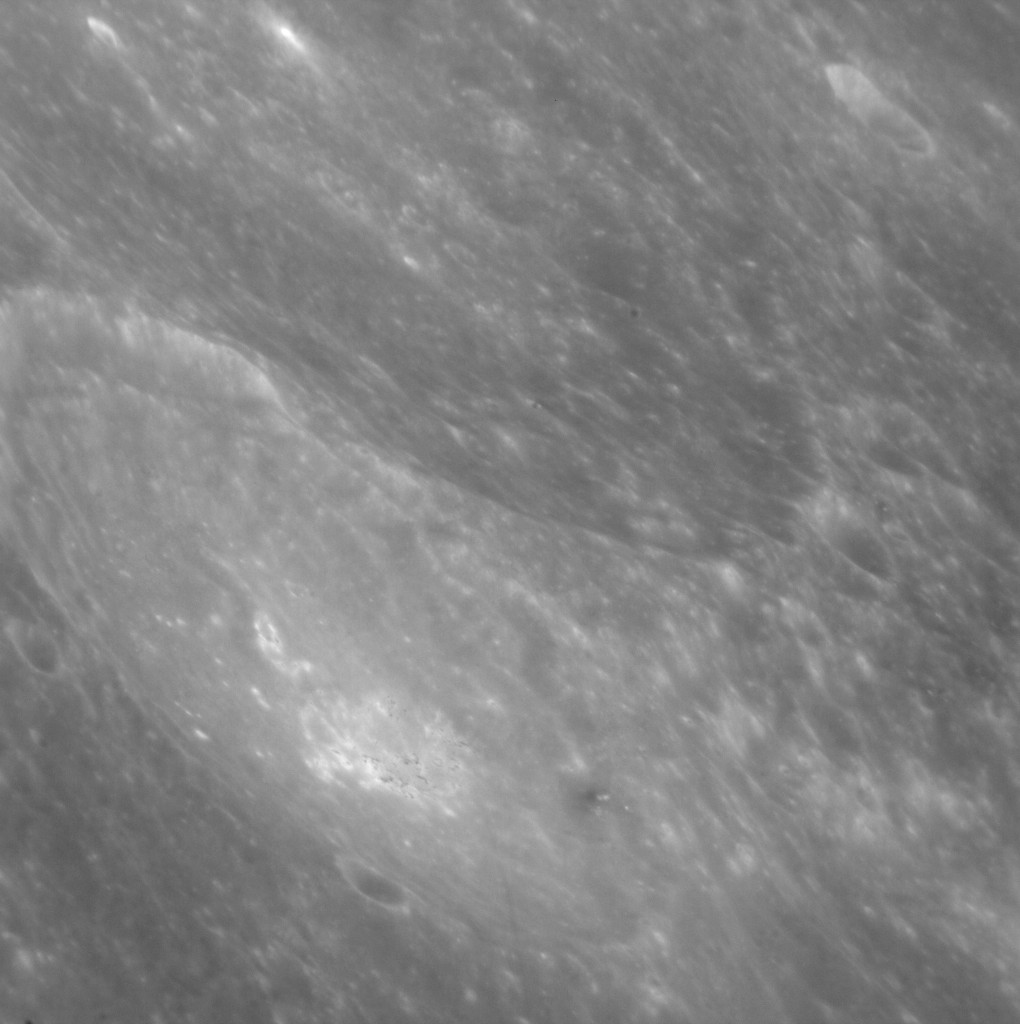
Highly oblique view
