= Prost (disambiguation) =

Prost may refer to:

== People ==
- Alain Prost (born 1955), French former Formula One driver and four times world champion,
- Sharon Prost (born 1951), American federal judge
- Michel Prost (born 1946), French former footballer
- Nico Prost (born 1981), French racing driver, son of Alain Prost

== Other uses ==
- Prost Grand Prix, the Formula One racing team owned by Alain Prost from 1997 to 2002
- Prost, an honorary toast in German

== See also ==
- Proust (disambiguation)
