= Mistral (crater) =

Crater on Mercury

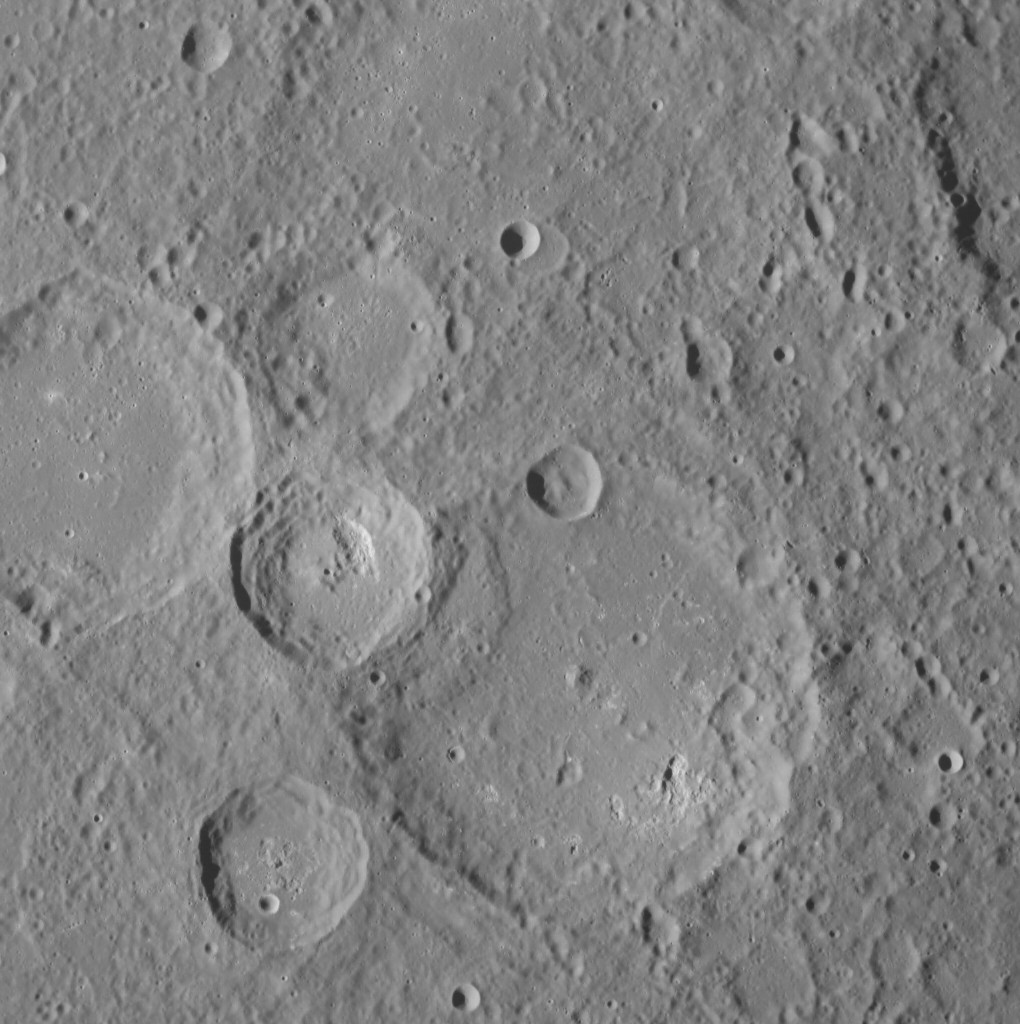
- MESSENGER WAC showing Mistral (bottom center) and Veronese (left of center) craters
- Feature type: Impact crater
- Location: Kuiper quadrangle, Mercury
- Coordinates: 4.70°N 54.67°W
- Diameter: 102.0 km (63.4 mi)
- Eponym: Gabriela Mistral

Mistral is a crater on Mercury. Its name was adopted by the International Astronomical Union (IAU) in 1976. Mistral is named for the Chilean poet Gabriela Mistral, who lived from 1889 to 1957.

A large irregular depression and several smaller ones are present in the southeastern part of the crater floor. A similar depression is present in the crater Veronese which overlies the northwest rim of Mistral, and small ones are present in the unnamed crater to the southwest. The depressions are similar to those within Navoi, Lermontov, Scarlatti, and Praxiteles. The depressions are thought to be caused by volcanic explosions.

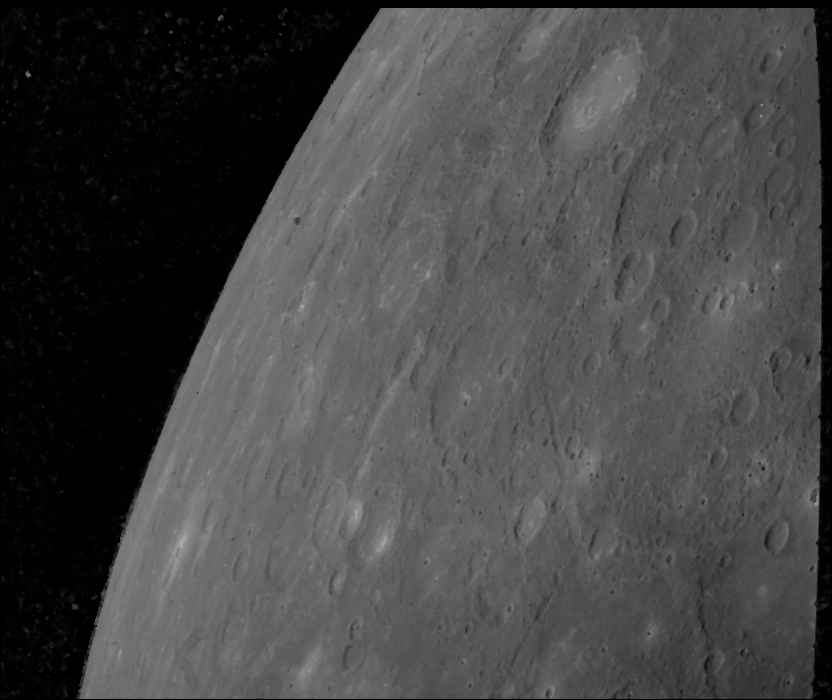
Mariner 10 image with Mistral near bottom center

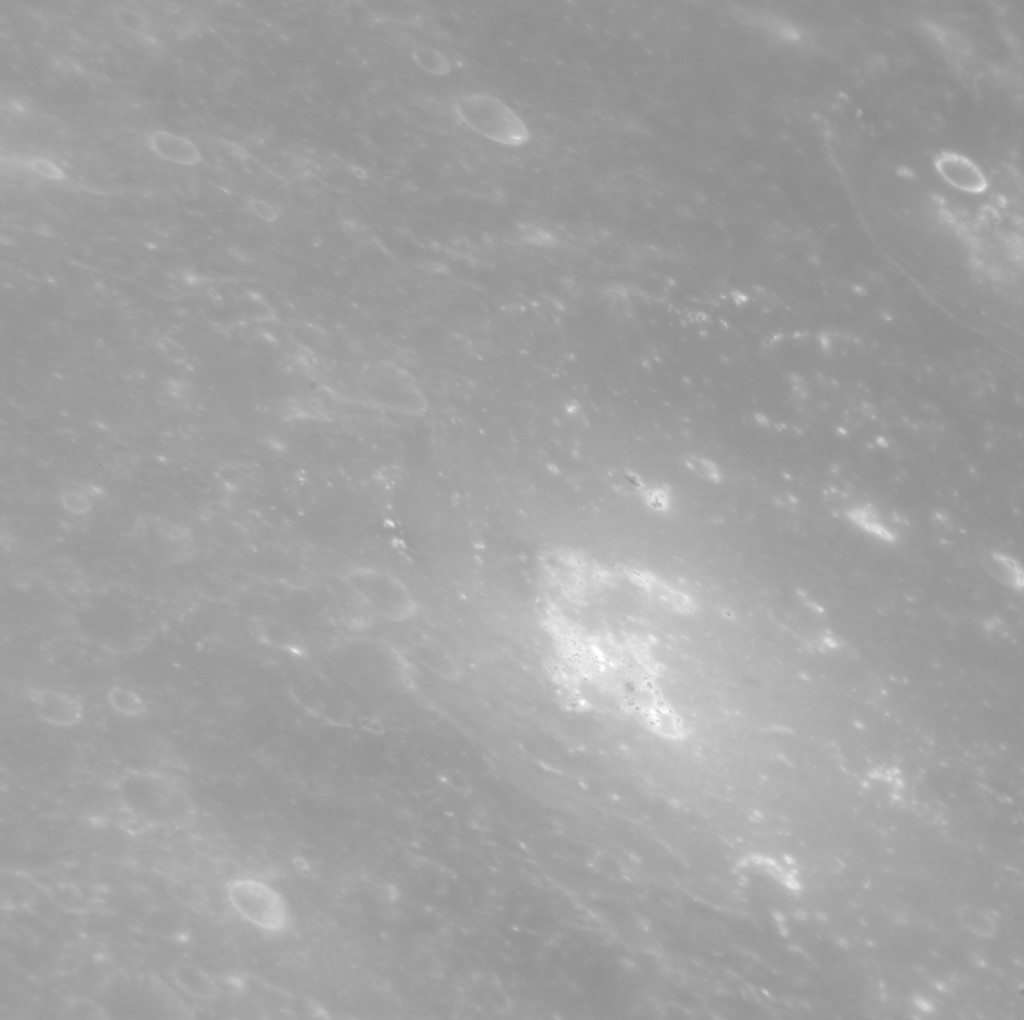
Bright area is irregular depression in southeastern Mistral, which may be volcanic

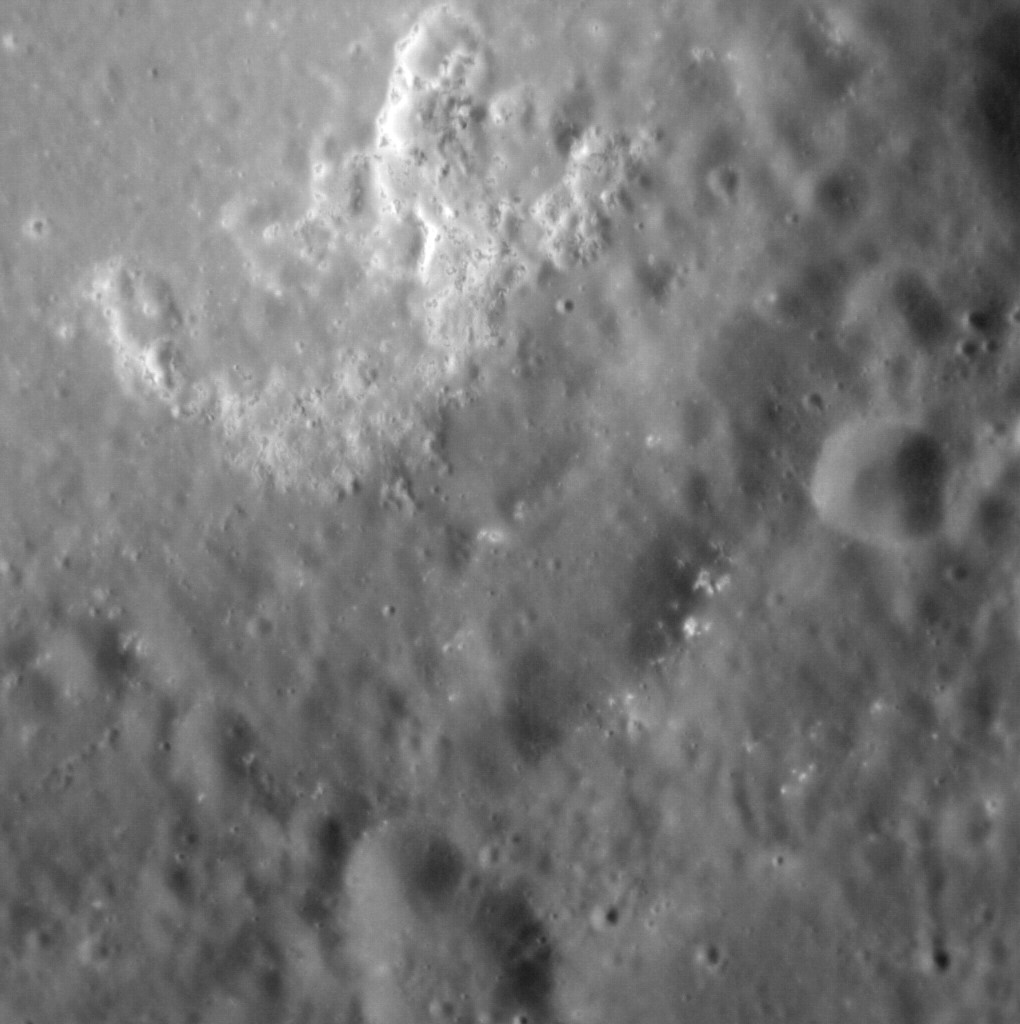
Close-up of the irregular depression
