= Bibliothèque du cinéma François-Truffaut =

Coordinates: 48.8619°N 2.3469°E

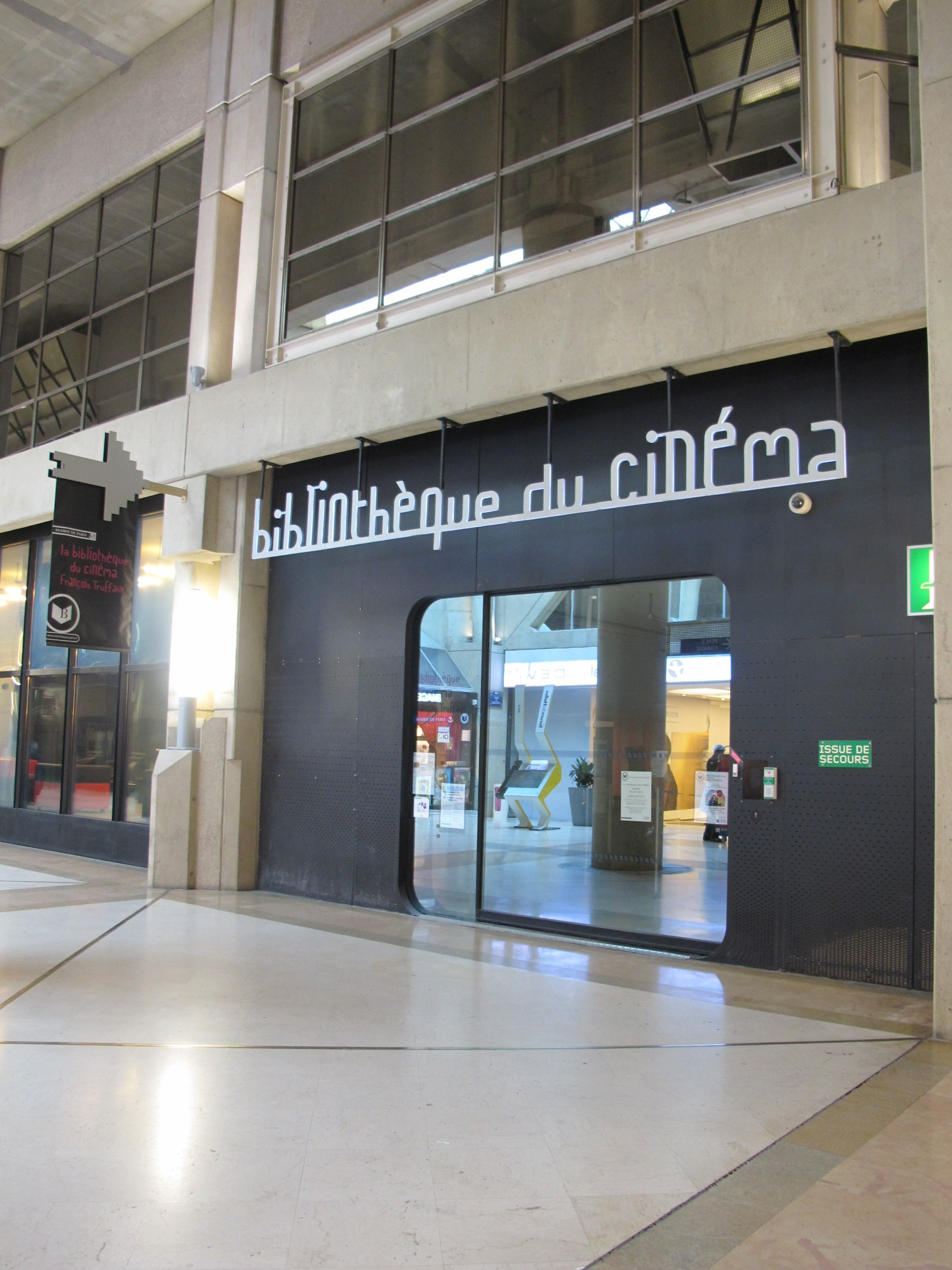
Bibliothèque du cinéma François-Truffaut

The Bibliothèque du cinéma François-Truffaut is a film library in Paris, France. It is located at 4 rue de Cinéma, in the Forum des Halles. Its collections consist of books, journals, film music, DVDs, and press reviews. It is named for the French film director François Truffaut.

== History of the collection and the library ==
In the early 1960s, librarians at the library of the 20th arrondissement of Paris started to collect cinematic documents (notably rare collections of reviews). Over the years, the collection grew, somewhat forgotten, and then was transferred to the André-Malraux library in the 6th arrondissement of Paris. This library, which was opened on Rennes street (rue de Rennes), offered more space. Overseen by Gilles Ciment, the son of Michel Ciment, the collection took the name "Bibliothèque du Cinéma" and continued to grow and become a richer and more organized collection. The Bibliothèque du Cinéma began to organize its own exhibits, publish a journal, and host panel screenings and lectures. The fifth level, the screening room, is how the ???. As the place was being increasingly missed, and in order to accommodate the growing number of visitors, the issue of relocation was addressed in the late 1980s. Gilles Ciment initially developed multiple projects for multiple vacant locations, then joined together with the team for the prefiguration of the Bibliothèque de France, which became the Bibliothèque François Mitterrand. This project was slow moving. It was not until 2006 that the move was initiated through a special library project.

== The library today ==
The Bibliothèque du cinéma François-Truffaut opened its doors on December 5, 2008.

== See also ==
- List of libraries in France
