= Truffaut (crater) =

Crater on Mercury

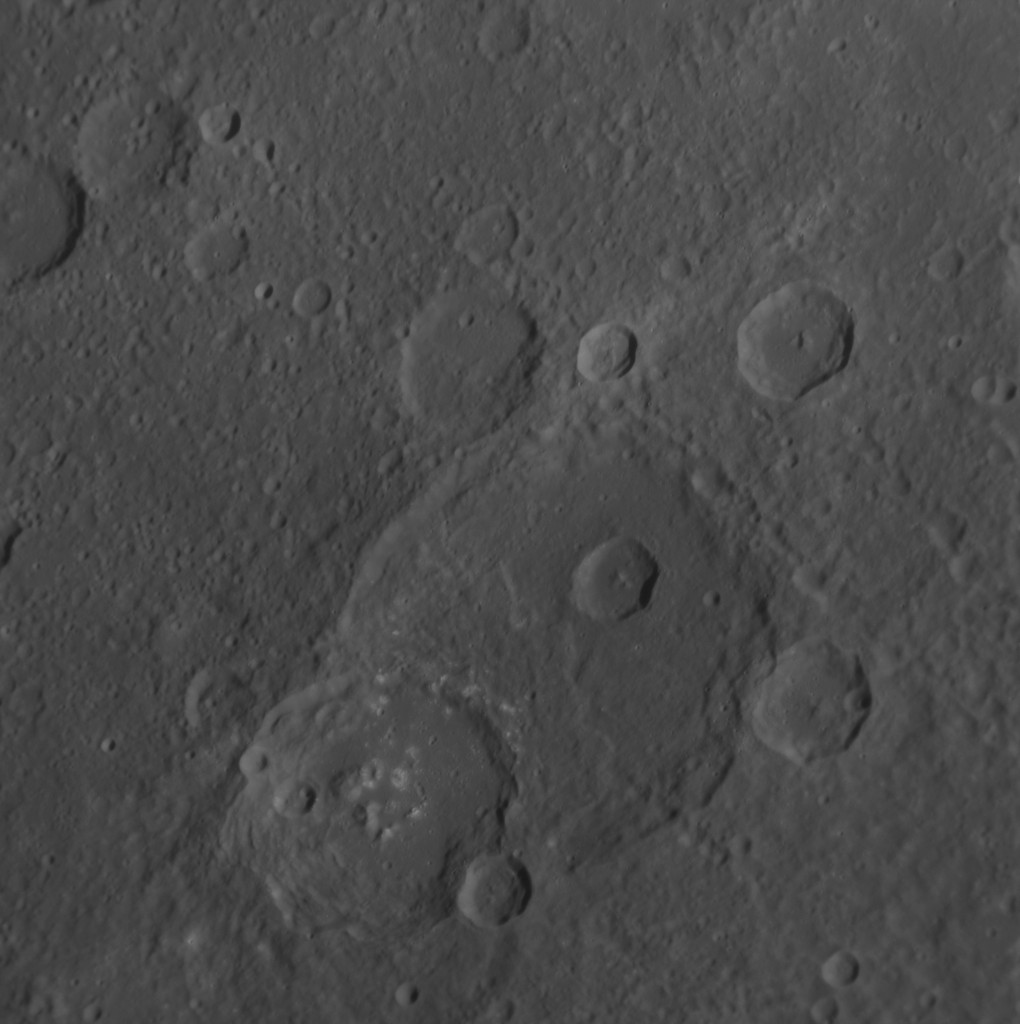
- MESSENGER NAC, from second flyby in October 2008
- Planet: Mercury
- Coordinates: 13.49°N 63.21°W
- Quadrangle: Kuiper
- Diameter: 79 km (49 mi)
- Eponym: François Truffaut

Truffaut is a crater on Mercury. Its name was adopted by the International Astronomical Union (IAU) on August 13, 2024, for the French filmmaker and art critic François Truffaut, who lived from 1932 to 1984. Hollows are present on the floor of Truffaut.

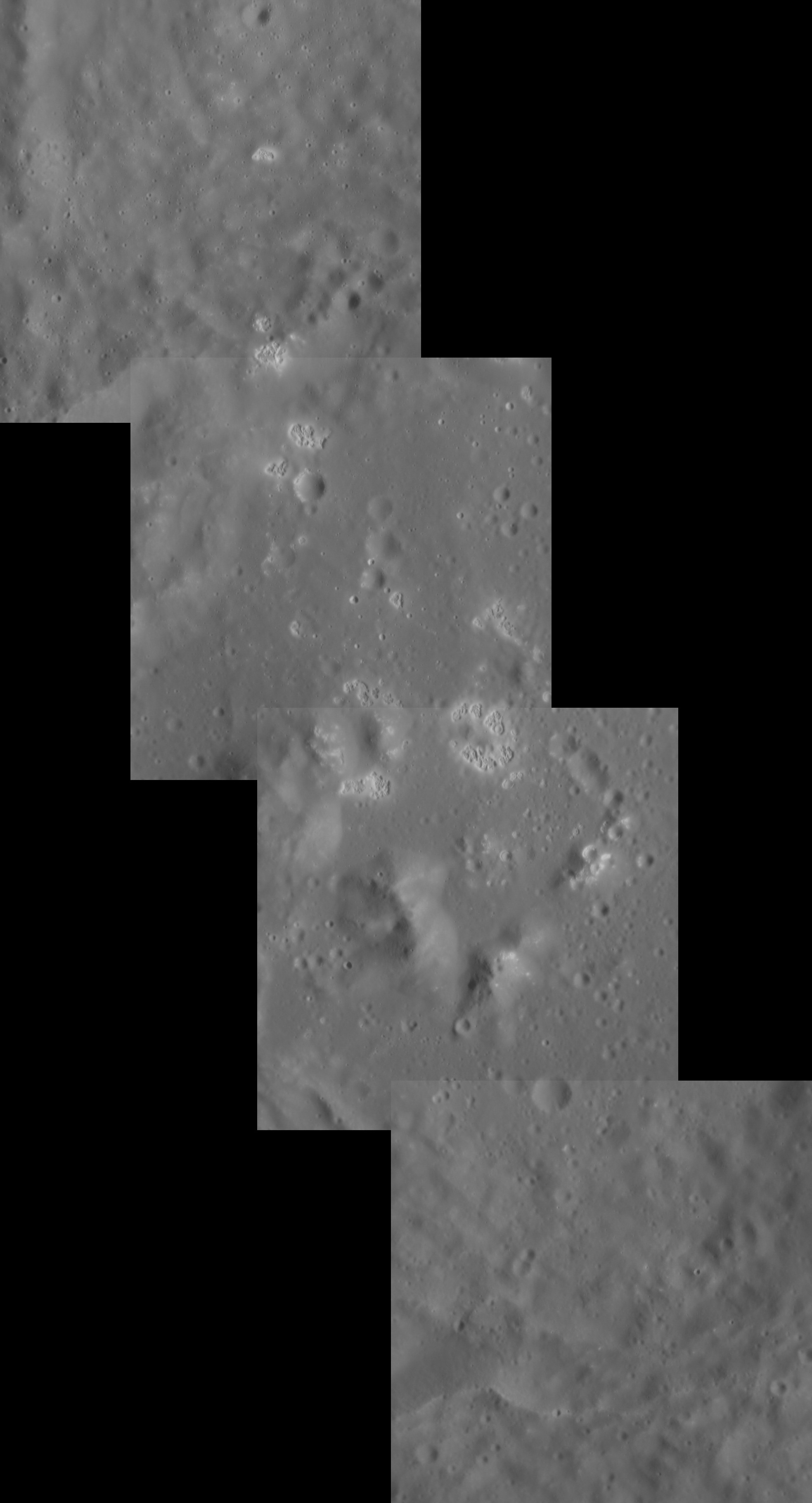
Hollows in Truffaut

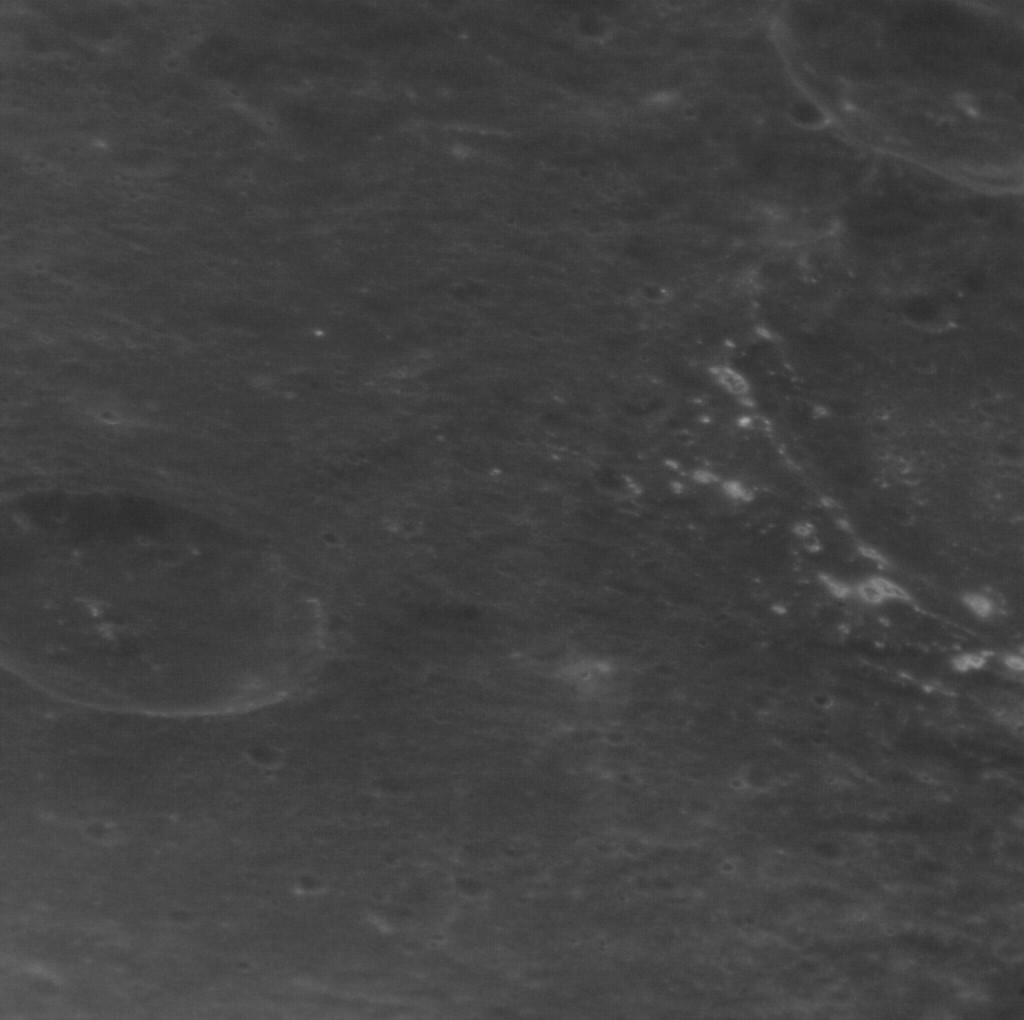
Some hollows are found outside the rim of Truffaut, on its ejecta

Truffaut overlies the southwest rim of a larger, unnamed crater. It is west of Giotto crater, which also has abundant hollows.
