= Bek (sculptor) =

Ancient Egyptian sculptor

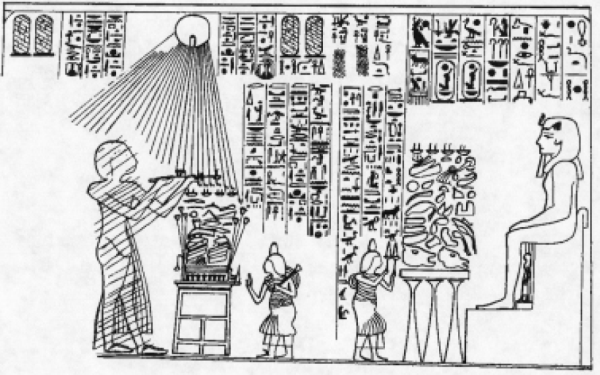
The Aswan stela of Men and Bek

G29 k A1
Bek
in hieroglyphs
Era: New Kingdom
(1550–1069 BC)

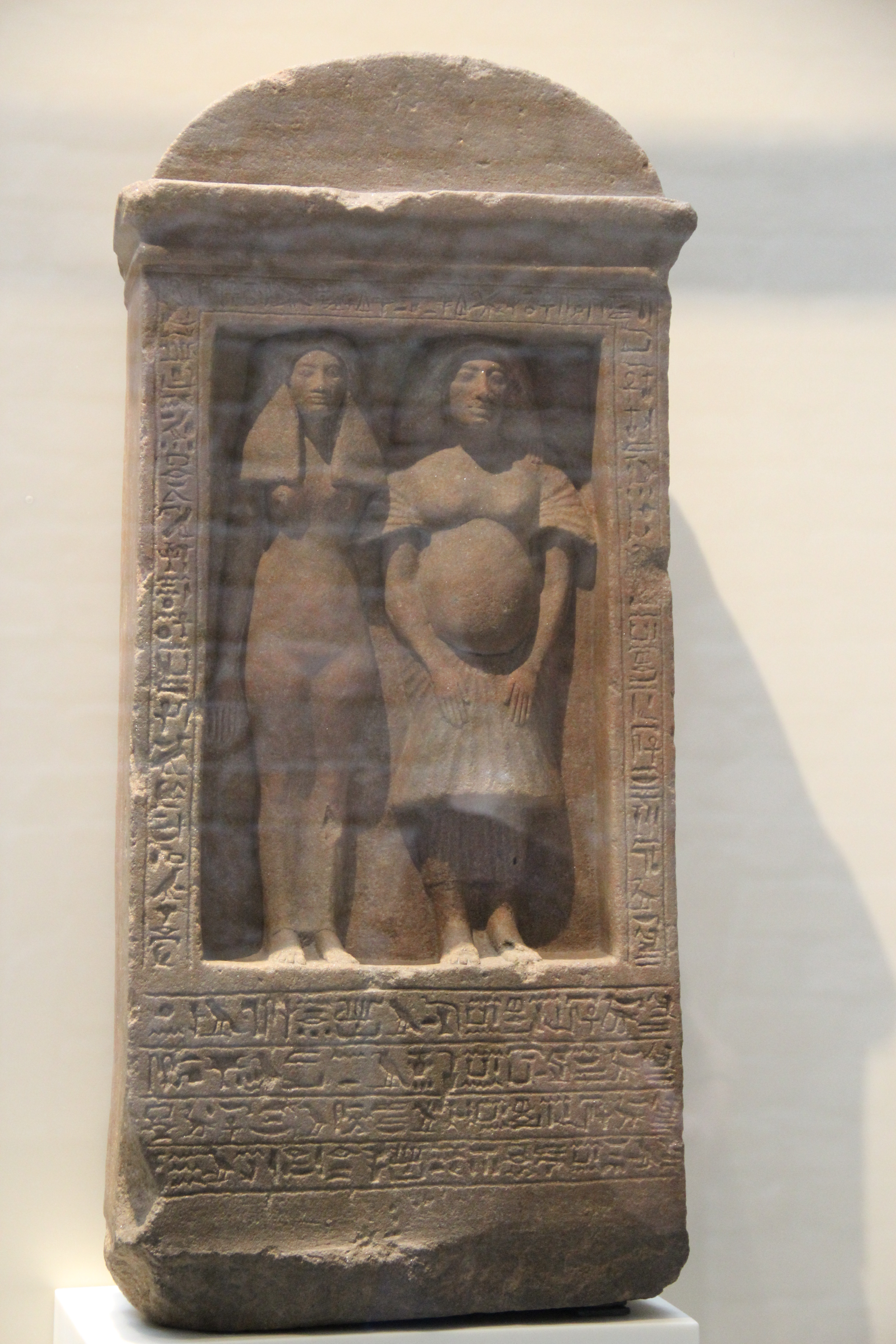
Bak, Self-portrait with his wife, Taheri (c.1353-1336 BC) Quartzite. Egyptian Museum, Berlin.

Bek or Bak (Egyptian for "Servant") was the first chief royal sculptor during the reign of Pharaoh Akhenaten. His father Men held the same position under Akhenaten's father Amenhotep III; his mother Roi was a woman from Heliopolis.

Bek grew up in Heliopolis, an important cult centre of the sun god Ra. The young prince Amenhotep (who became the pharaoh Akhenaten) had a palace here, and it is likely that his religious views were formed in part by the Heliopolitan teachings. Bek followed his lord to Akhet-Aten, the city founded by Akhenaten. He oversaw the construction of the great temple statues of the king and the opening of the Aswan and Gebel es-Silsila stone quarries, from where the stone was transported.

A stela found in Aswan, made around the 9th regnal year of Akhenaten shows Men and his son Bek with the pharaohs they serve. On the right side Men stands before the statue of Amenhotep III. The statue is very likely to be one of the colossi of the pharaoh that was made by Men. This side of the stela reflects the traditional artistic style of the 18th Dynasty, and the only indication of the Amarna Period is that the name "Amenhotep" is left out, instead of it the pharaoh's throne name "Nebmaatre" is repeated, in order to avoid having to mention the god Amun whose cult was forbidden. On the left side of the stela Bek is shown before Akhenaten, who makes offerings to his god Aten; according to the inscription the depicted scene is set in the Great Temple of the Aten. A typical feature of Amarna era pictures, the rays of Aten end in hands. Aten's and Akhenaten's name was later chiseled out.

On the stela Bek states that he is "the apprentice whom His Majesty taught". It is likely that he oversaw the making of the statues which show Akhenaten and his family in an overly naturalistic style, breaking with the idealised depiction that tradition demanded.

A stela (now in Berlin) shows Bek with his wife Taheret. This is possibly the first self-portrait in history. The inscription of this stela also mentions him being taught by Akhenaten. A drawing of Akhenaten, which depicts the pharaoh and Aten and is likely to have been made in the early years of his reign, is possibly Bek's work. This picture shows Aten with a falcon-headed man, which was an attribute of Ra.

Some other sculptors of the Amarna Period are also known by name, including Thutmose and Yuti, sculptor of Queen Tiye.
