= Lermontov (crater) =

Crater on Mercury

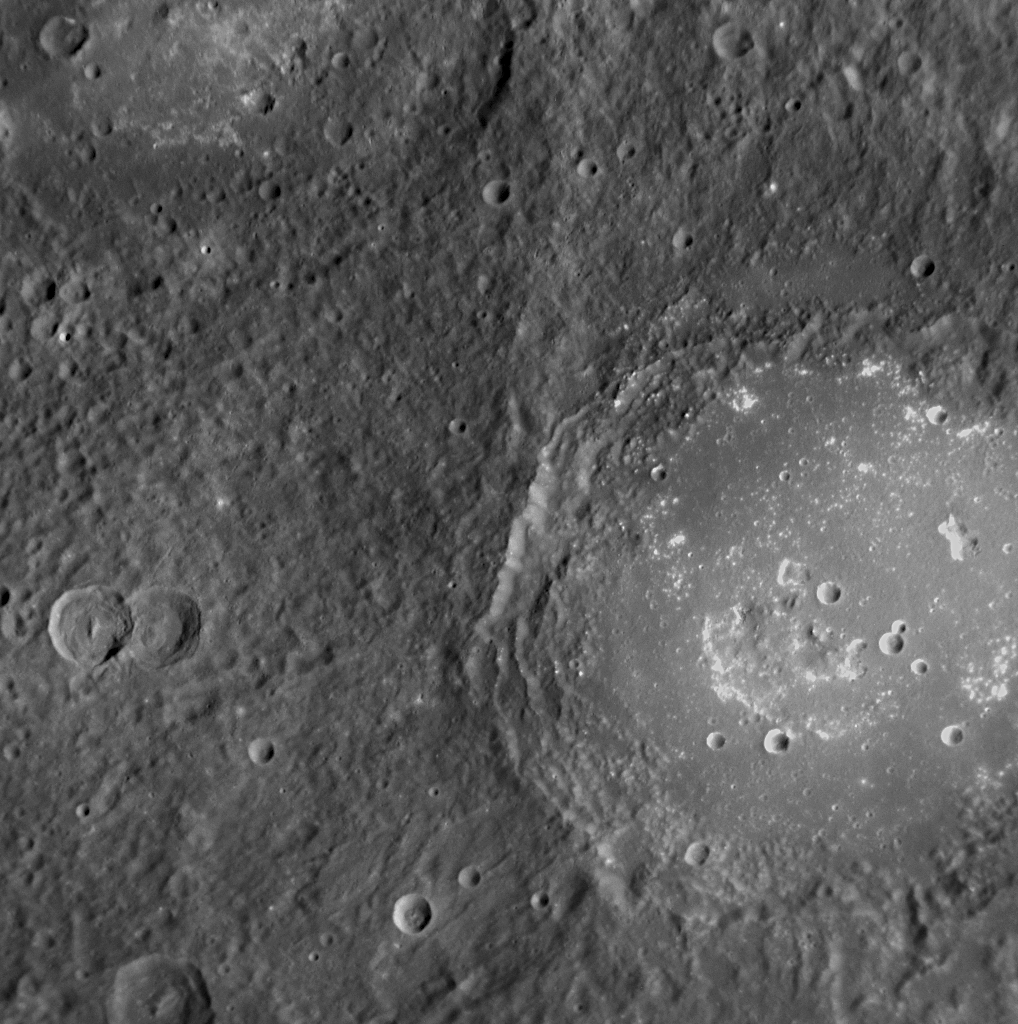
- MESSENGER image from its second flyby in October 2008
- Feature type: Impact crater
- Location: Kuiper quadrangle, Mercury
- Coordinates: 15.24°N 48.94°W
- Diameter: 166 km (103 mi)
- Eponym: Mikhail Yuryevich Lermontov

Lermontov is an impact crater on the planet Mercury. The crater is named after Mikhail Yuryevich Lermontov, a 19th-century Russian poet. The name was approved by the International Astronomical Union in 1976.

The crater floor is somewhat brighter than the exterior surface and is smooth with several irregularly shaped depressions. Such features, similar to those found on the floor of Praxiteles, may be evidence of past explosive volcanic activity on the crater floor. Lermontov appears reddish in enhanced-color views, suggesting that it has a different composition from the surrounding surface.

To the north of Lermontov are Proust and Bek craters. To the south is Chaikovskij, and to the southwest is Giotto.

== Views ==
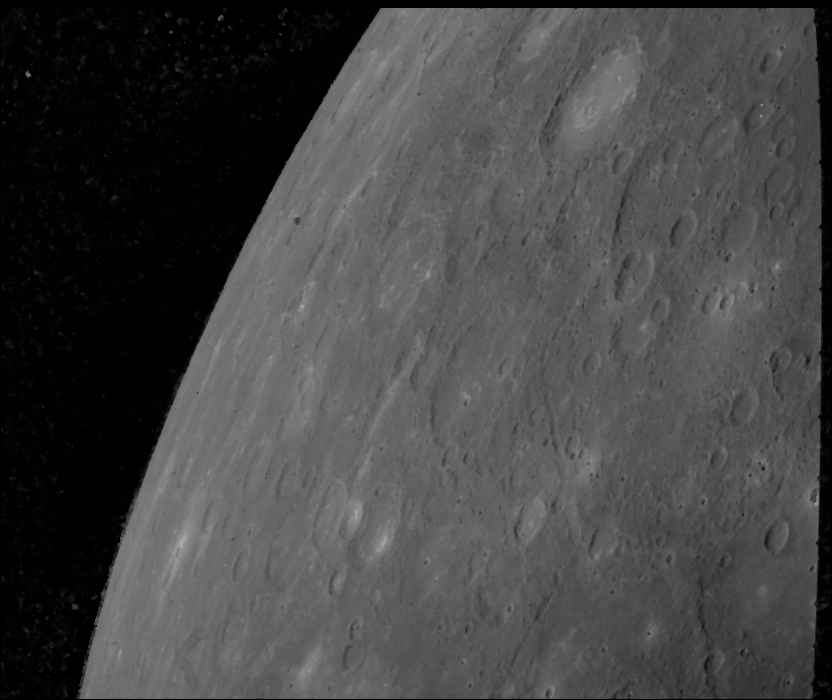
Mariner 10 image with Lermontov in upper right corner

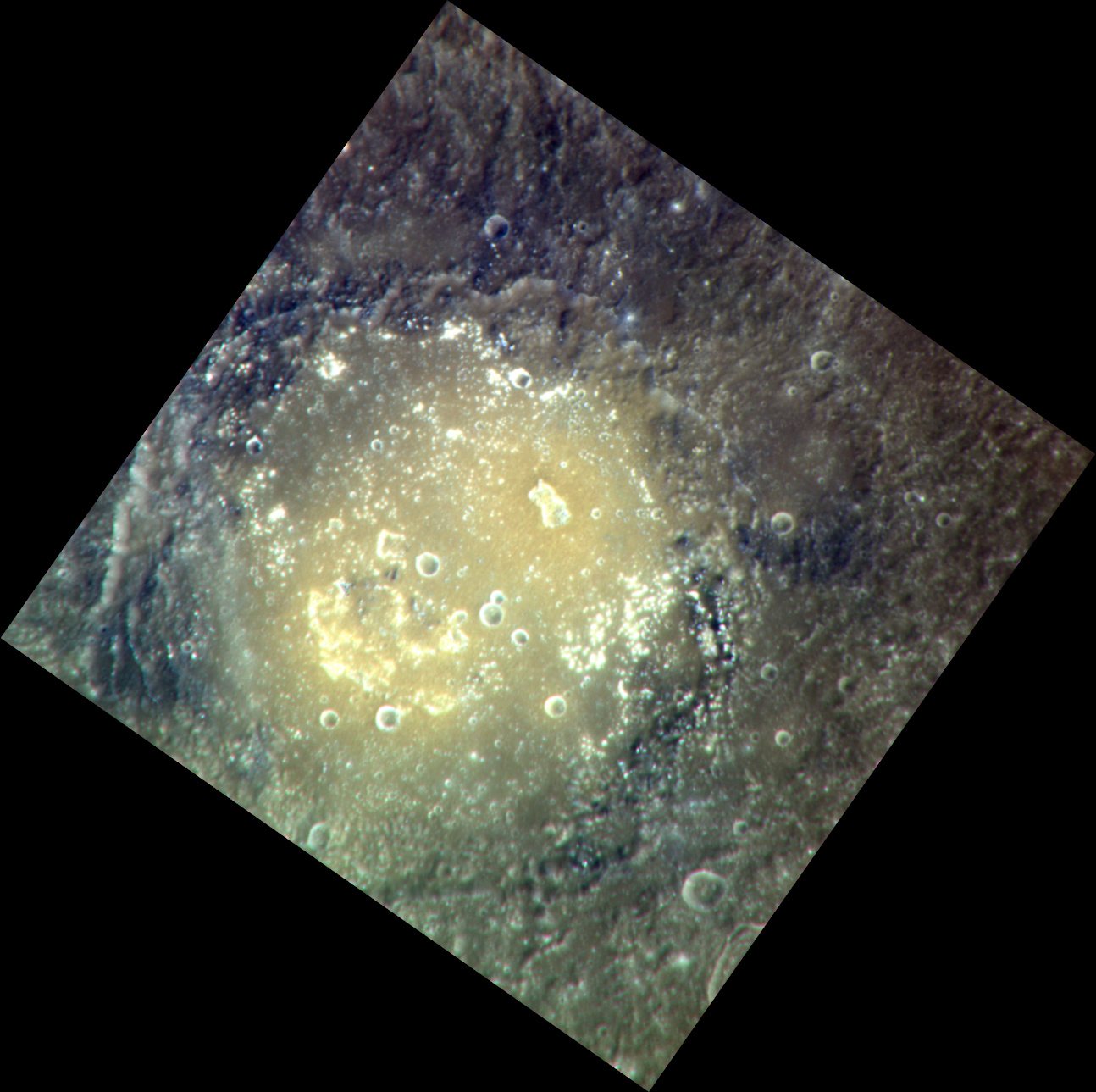
Lermontov in approximate color

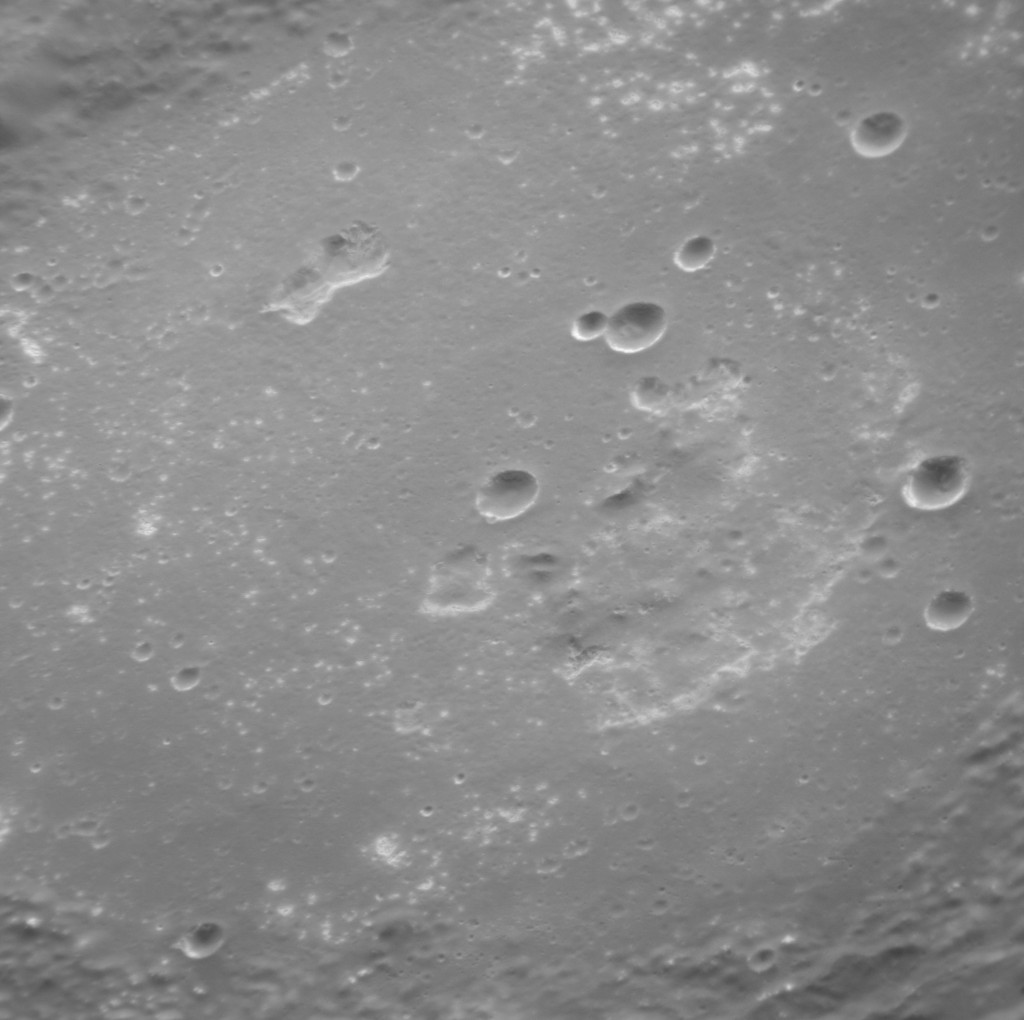
Oblique view of the interior of Lermontov. Bright spots are hollows.

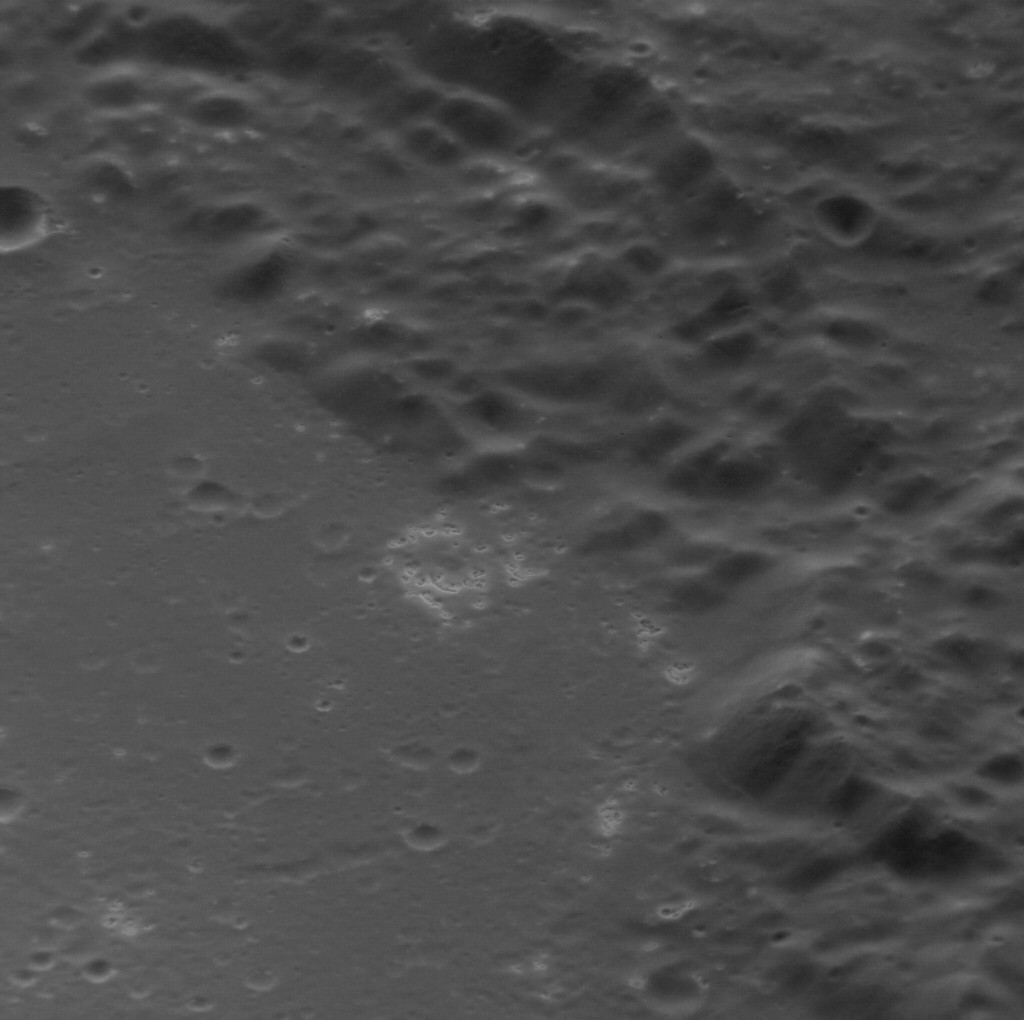
Hollows in northern Lermontov crater

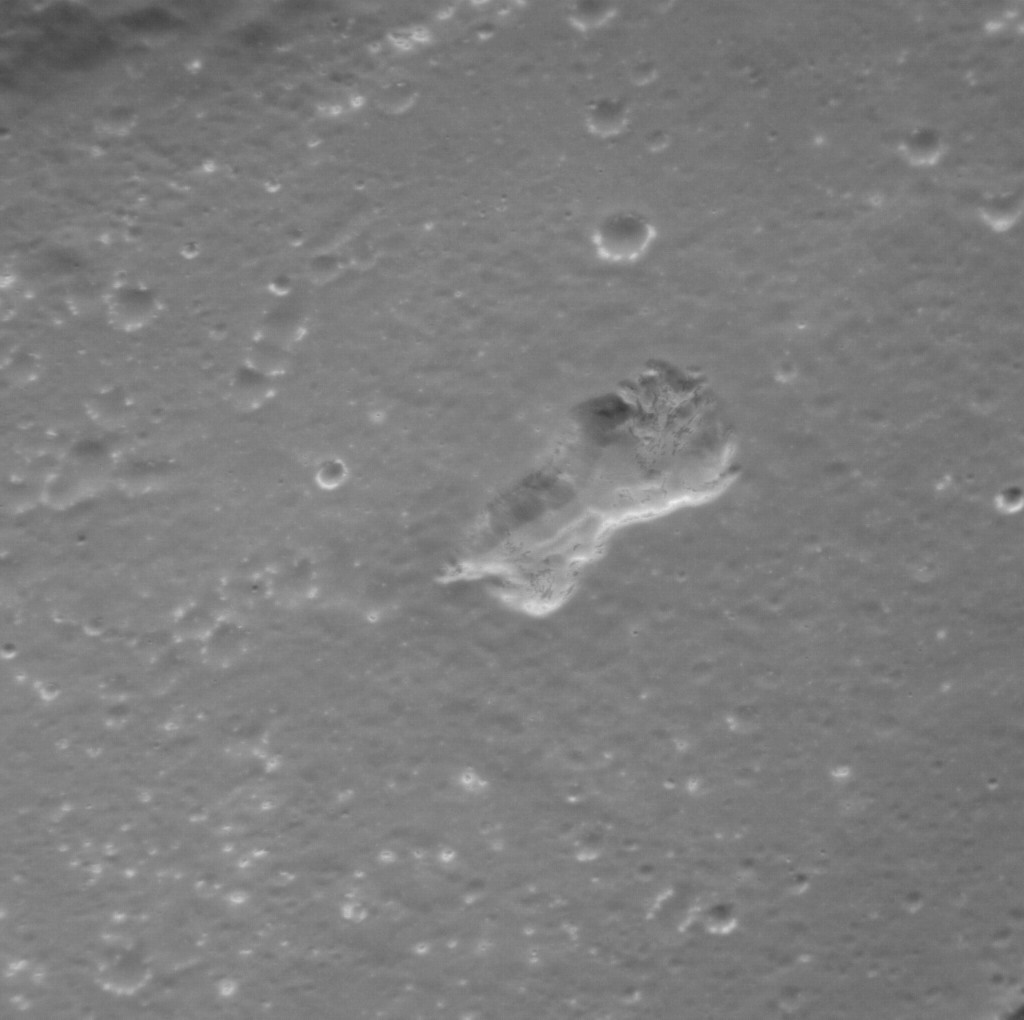
One of the depressions in Lermontov
