= Proust (crater) =

Crater on Mercury

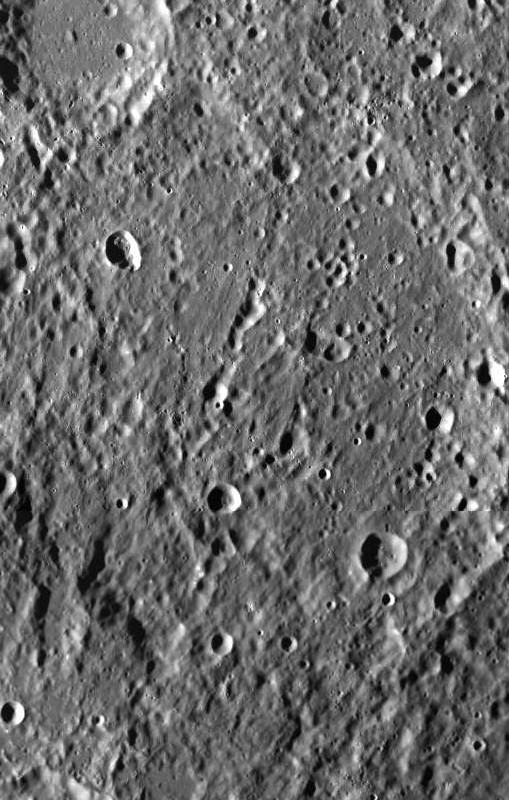
- MESSENGER WAC mosaic
- Planet: Mercury
- Coordinates: 19.56°N 47.59°W
- Quadrangle: Kuiper
- Diameter: 145 km (90 mi)
- Eponym: Marcel Proust

Proust is a crater on Mercury. Its name was adopted by the International Astronomical Union (IAU) in 1976. It is named after the French novelist Marcel Proust.

Proust is located northeast of Lermontov crater.
