= Praxiteles (crater) =

Crater on Mercury

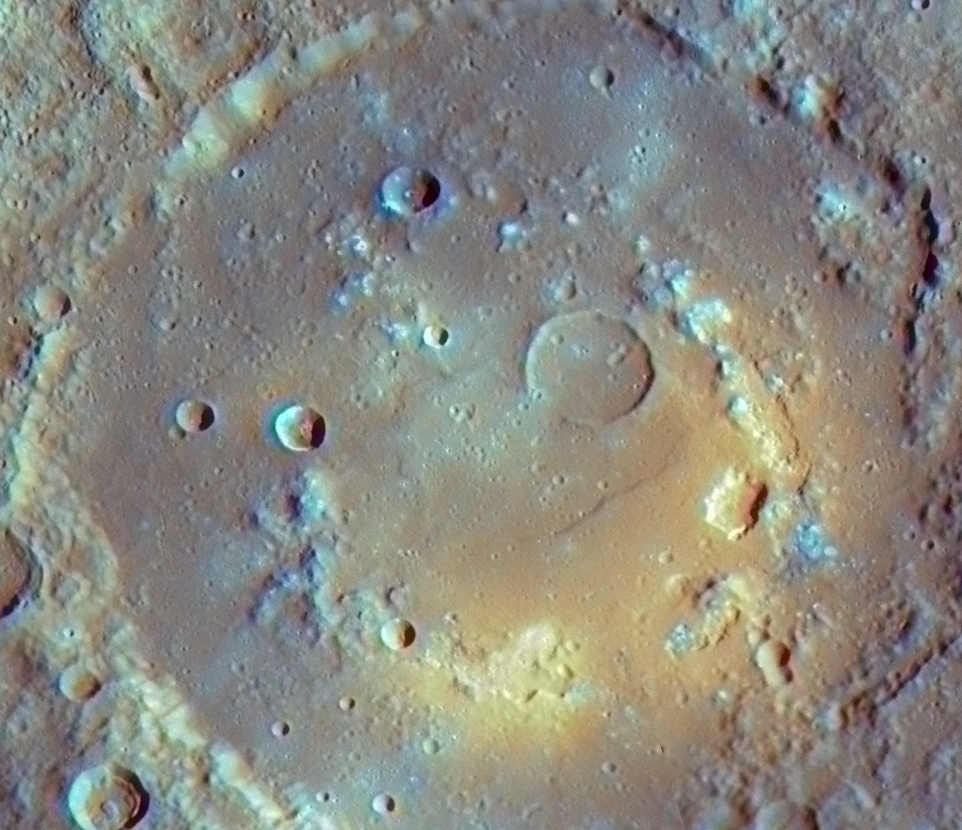
- Color-enhanced photograph by MESSENGER
- Feature type: Peak-ring impact basin
- Location: Victoria quadrangle, Mercury
- Coordinates: 27.11°N 60.28°W
- Diameter: 198 km (123 mi)
- Eponym: Praxiteles

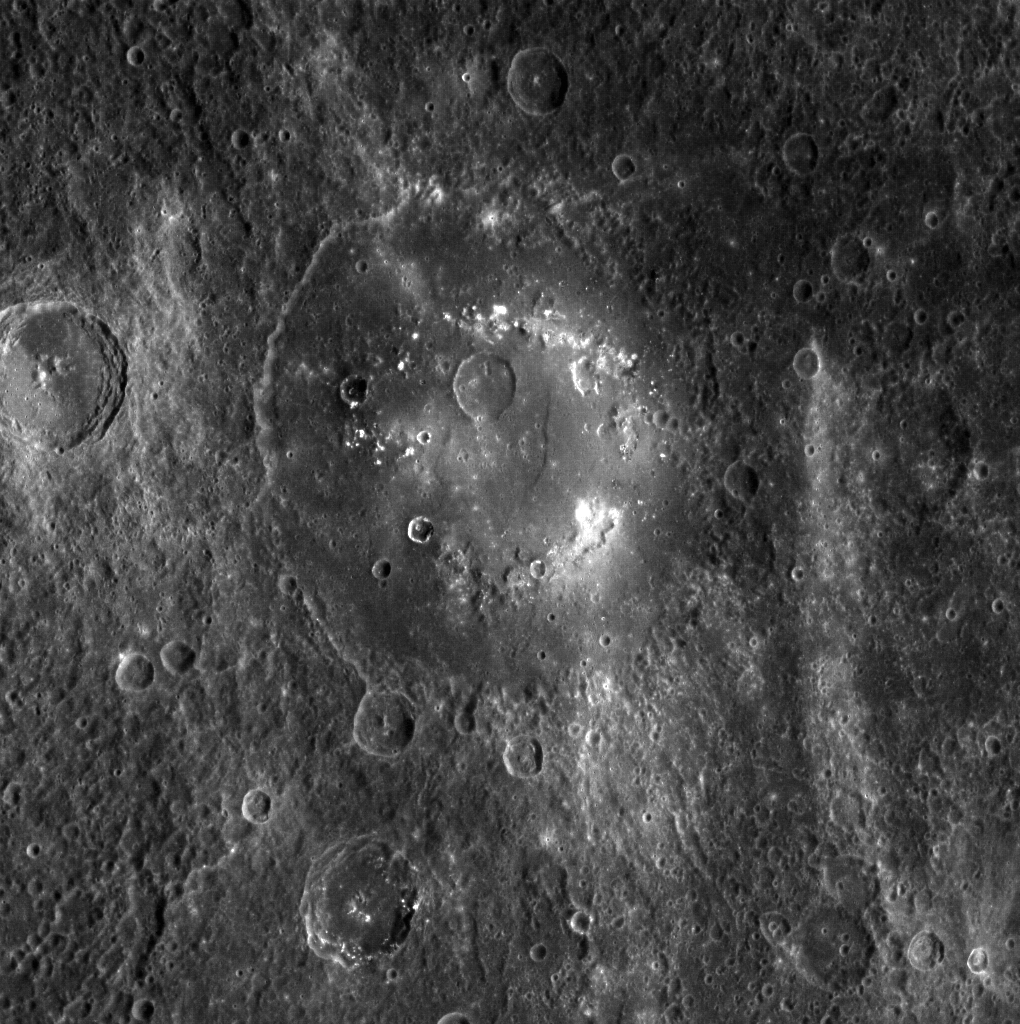
Another view from MESSENGER

Praxiteles is a crater on Mercury. It is one of 110 peak ring basins on Mercury.

MESSENGER's high-resolution images obtained during the mission's second Mercury flyby have revealed a number of irregularly shaped depressions on the floor of Praxiteles crater, making it a pit-floor crater. The colors near these depressions in wide angle camera (WAC) images are similar to those near volcanoes discovered during the mission's first Mercury flyby along the inner edge of the Caloris basin. The similar colors and the association with the irregular depressions (possible volcanic vents) are suggestive of past volcanic activity on the floor of Praxiteles.

The light coloration associated with the peak ring is now known as Orm Facula.

Praxiteles crater, first observed by Mariner 10, was named in 1979 by the IAU after the ancient Greek sculptor Praxiteles.

== Hollows ==
Hollows are abundant on the floor of Praxiteles.

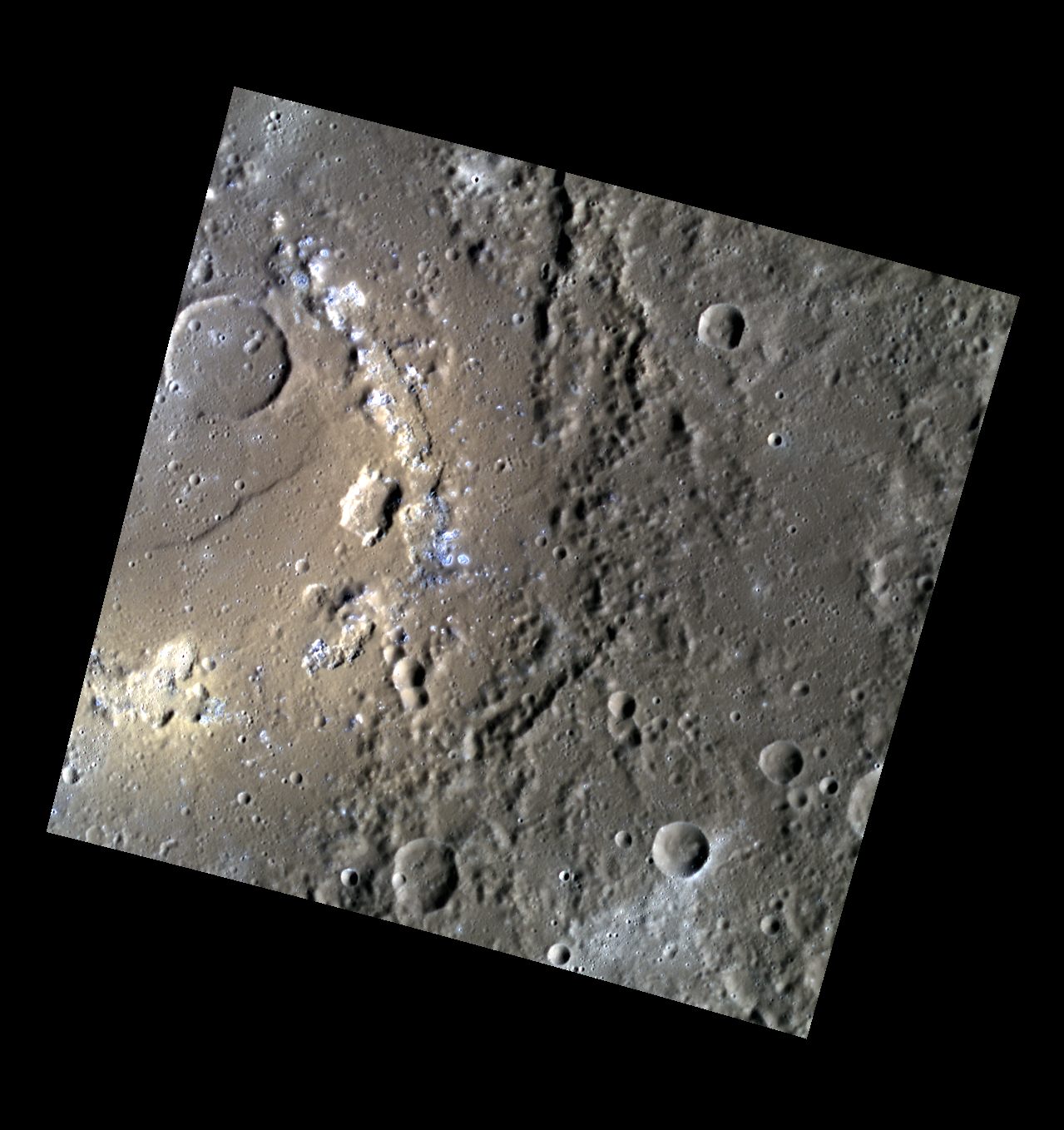
The bluish patches in this image are hollows

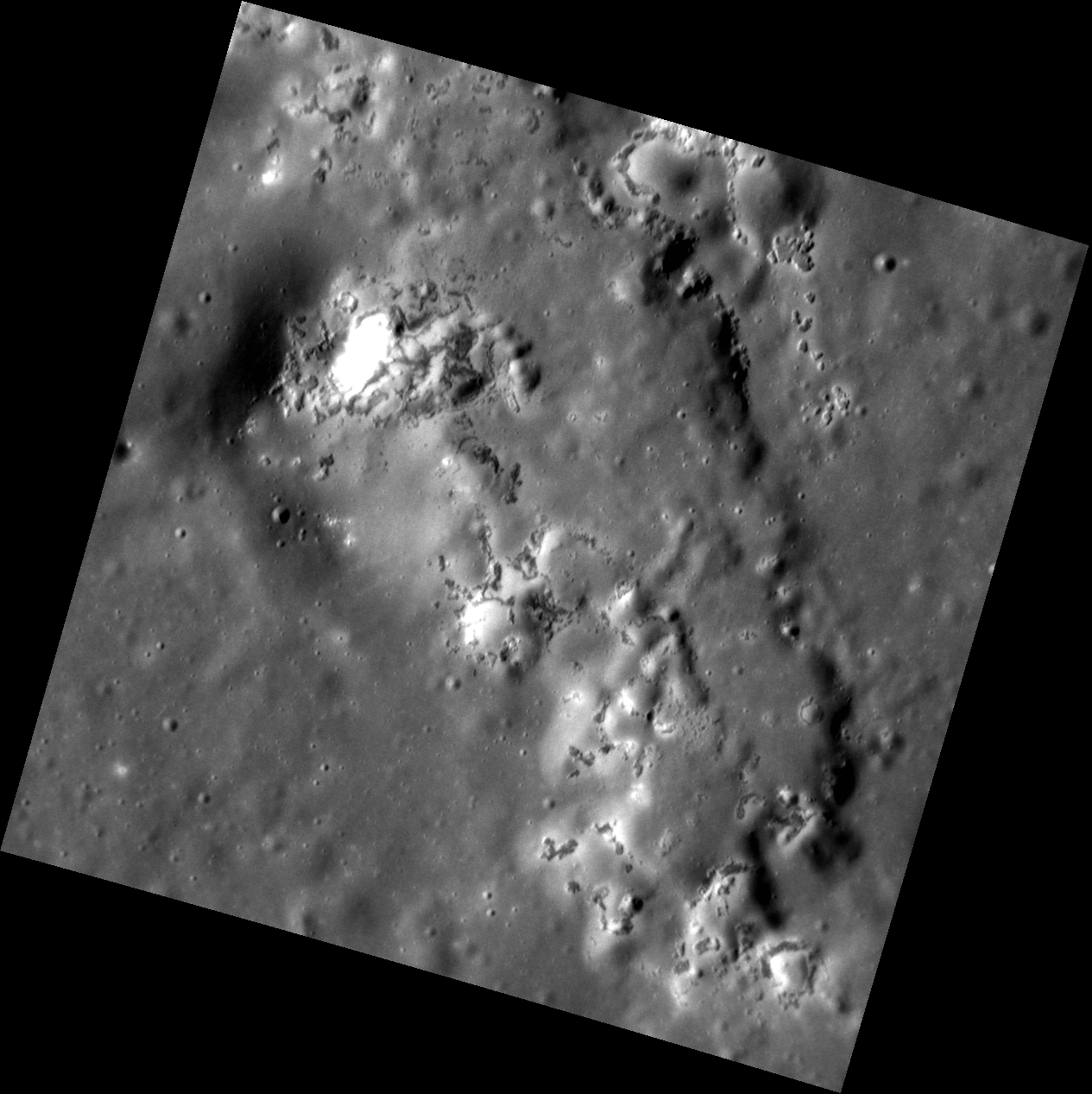
Close up of hollows on the eastern peak ring

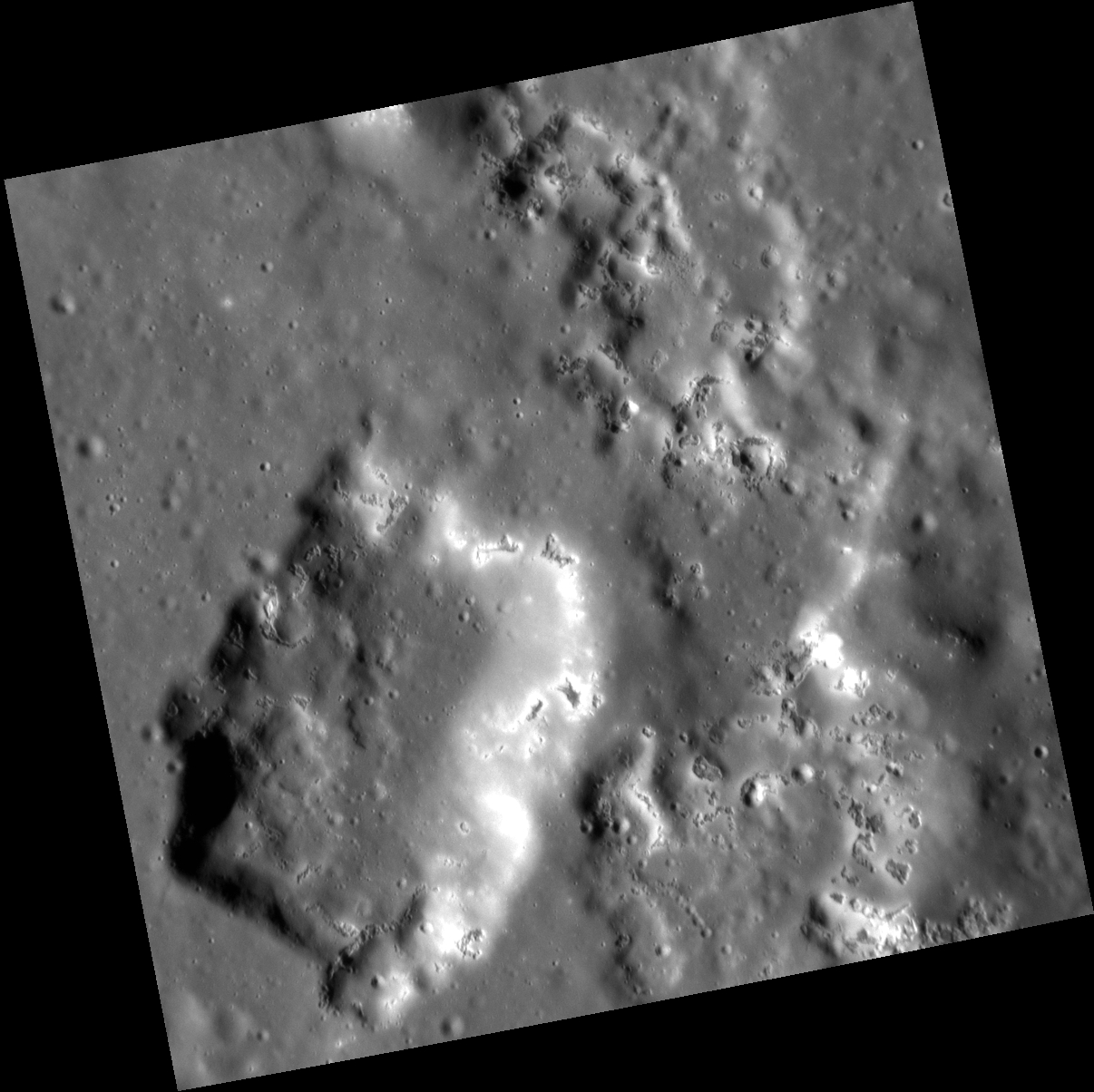
Hollows within and near one of the large volcanic depressions

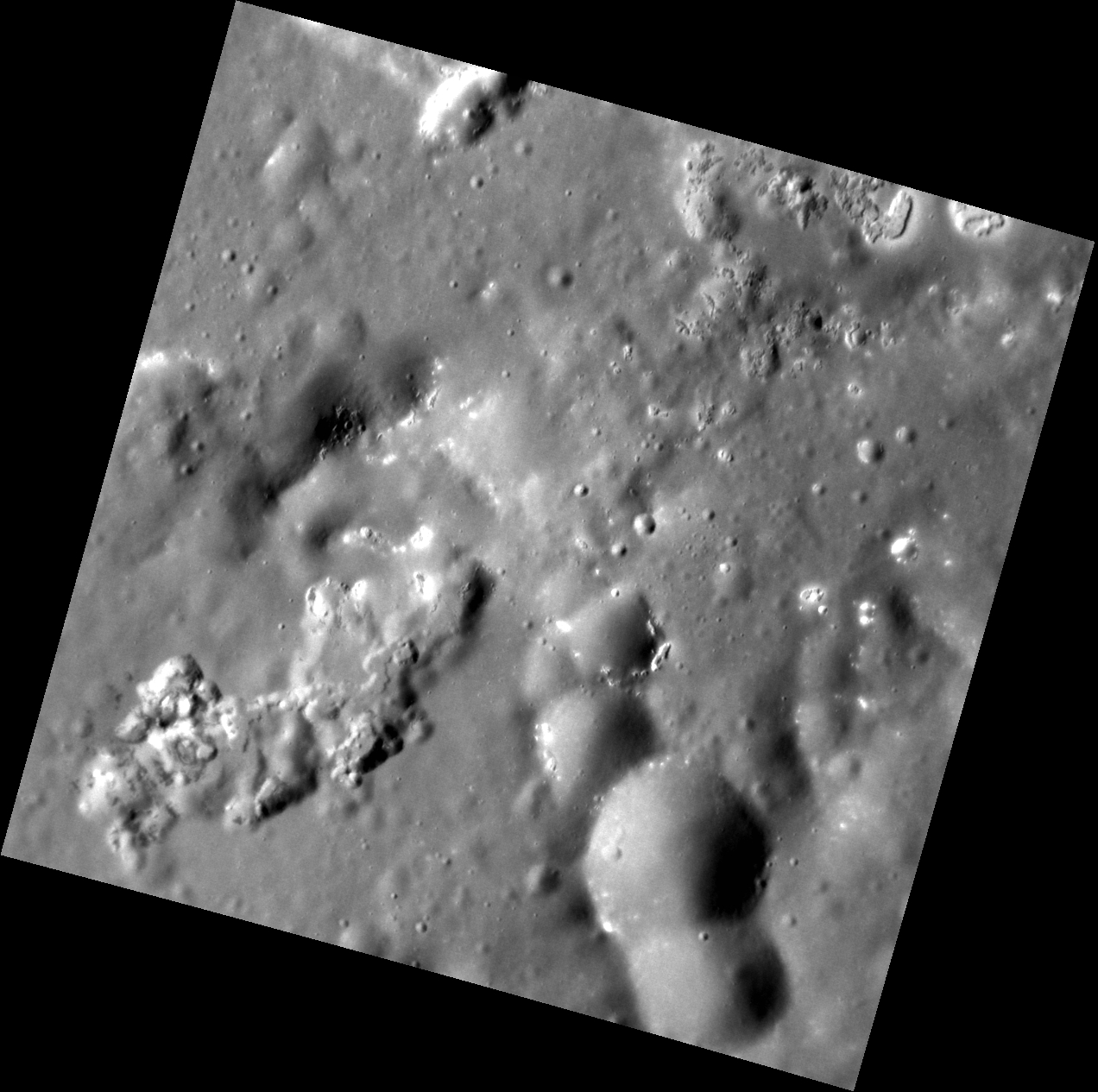
Hollows within another volcanic depression
