= Dali (crater) =

Crater on Mercury

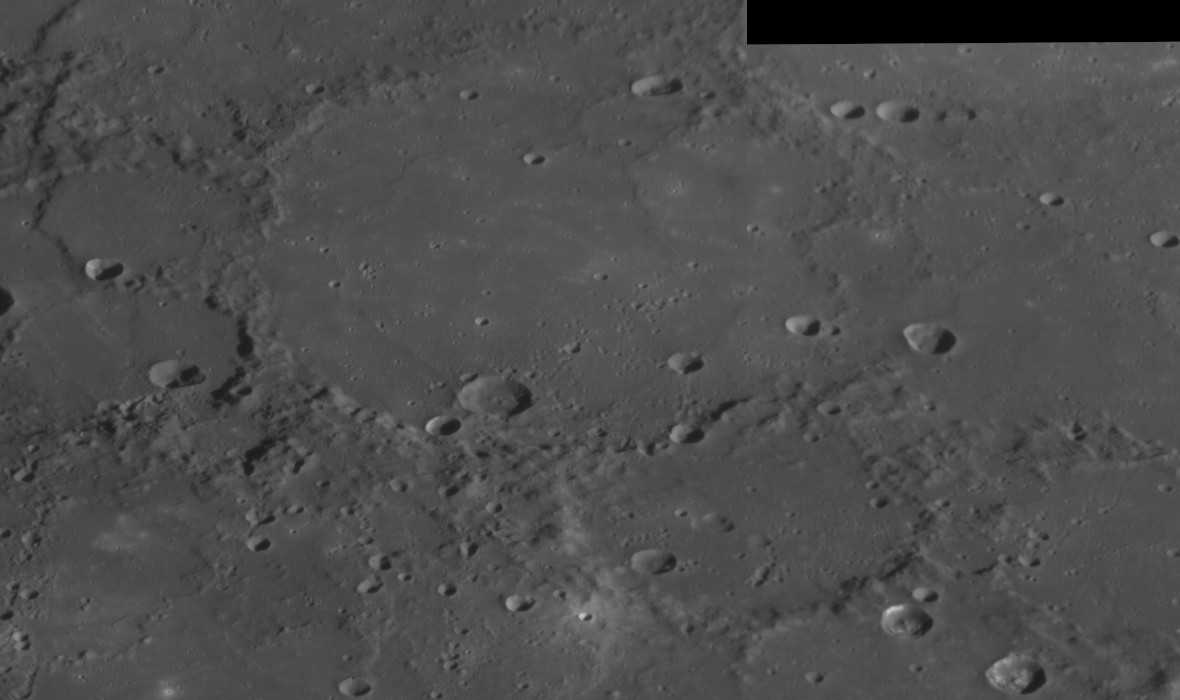
- MESSENGER mosaic focused on Dali from the first flyby on 14 January 2008
- Feature type: Impact crater
- Location: Raditladi quadrangle, Mercury
- Coordinates: 45.16°N 240.26°W
- Diameter: 176 km (109 mi)
- Eponym: Salvador Dalí

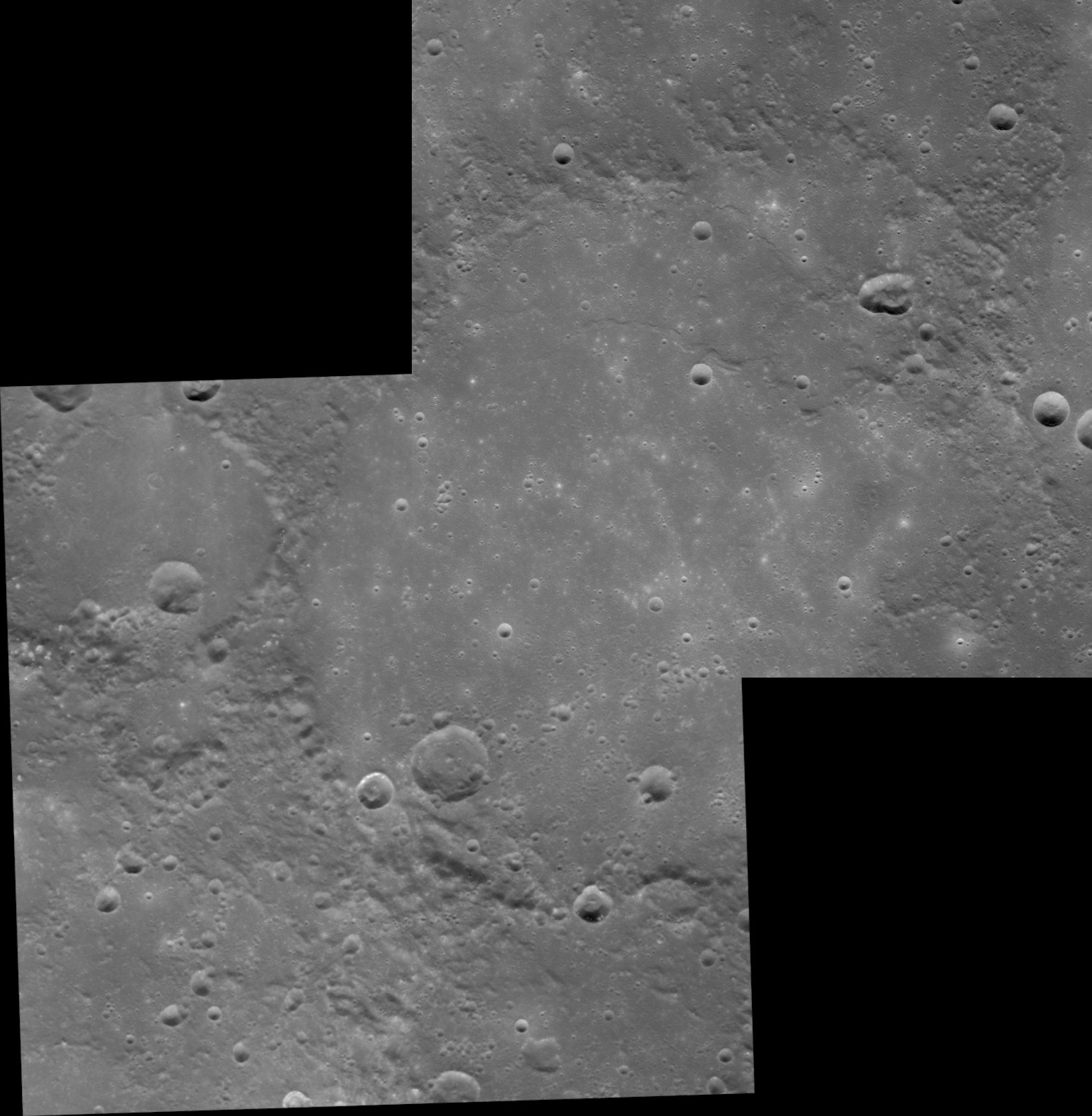
MESSENGER WAC mosaic

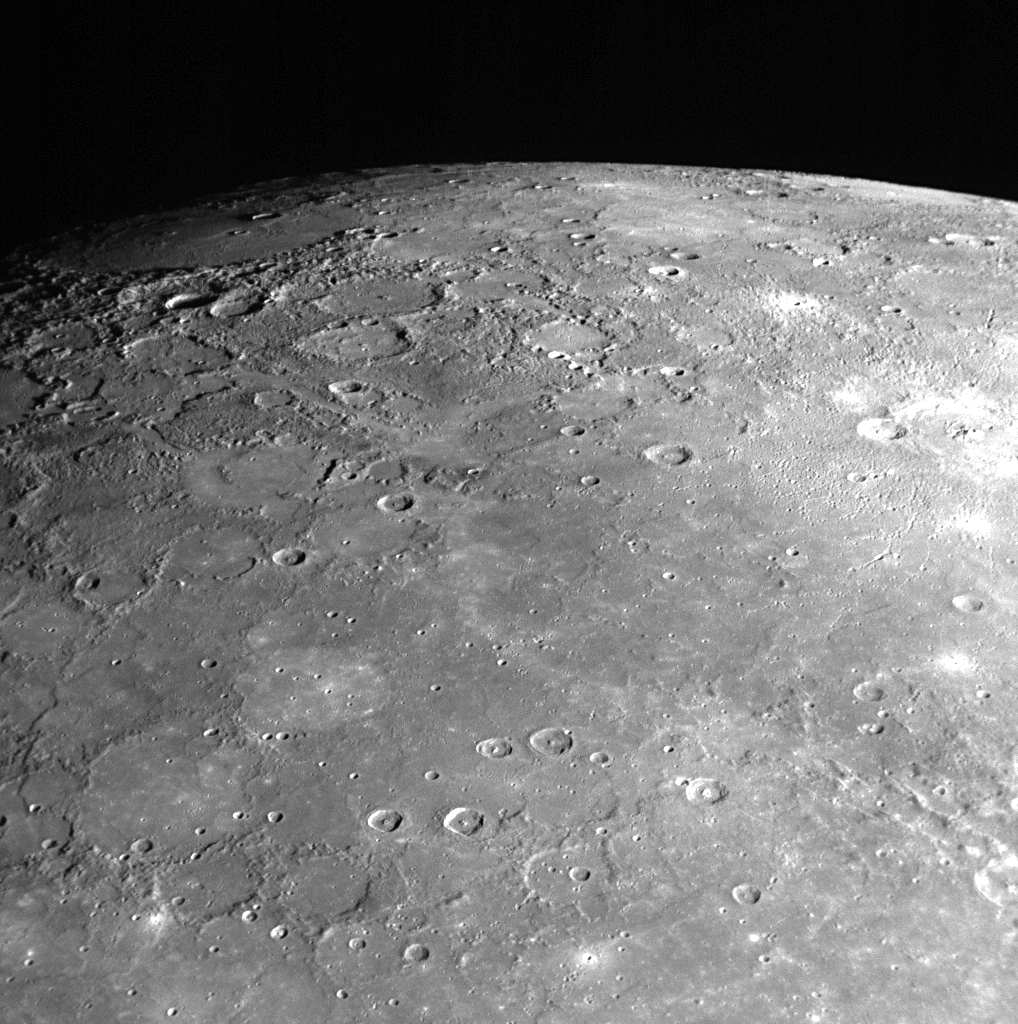
Dali is in the lower left of this MESSENGER image

Dali is a crater on Mercury. It has a diameter of 176 kilometers. Its name was adopted by the International Astronomical Union in 2008. Dali is named for the Spanish painter Salvador Dalí (1904-1989).

The smooth plains material filling Dali crater are believed to be volcanic, similar to the maria on the moon.

The crater Kofi is to the north of Dali. Pasch is to the east, and Mahsati is to the southwest.
