= Mahsati (crater) =

Crater on Mercury

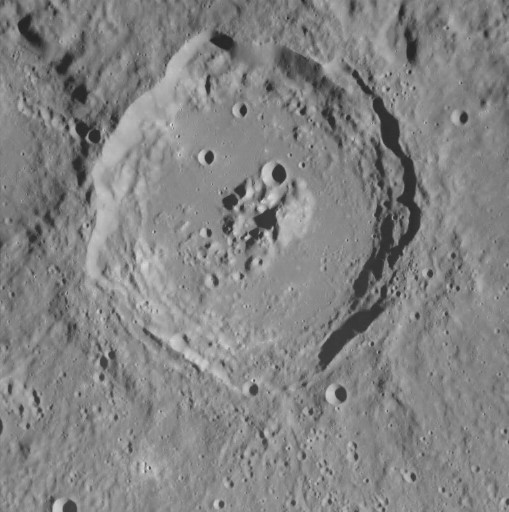
- MESSENGER WAC
- Planet: Mercury
- Coordinates: 39.57°N 250.29°W
- Quadrangle: Raditladi
- Diameter: 79.0 km (49.1 mi)
- Eponym: Mahsati Ganjavi

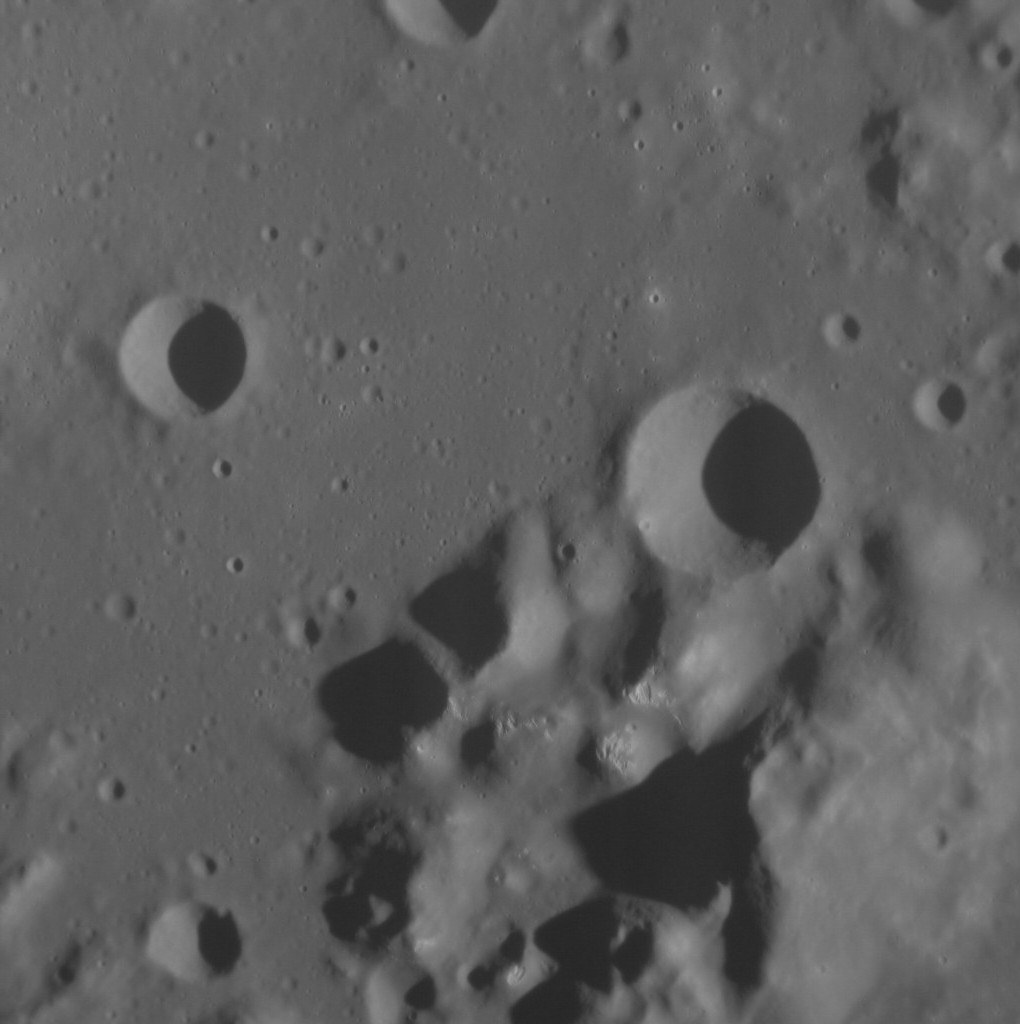
Detail of central peak, showing hollows.

Mahsati is a crater on Mercury. Its name was adopted by the International Astronomical Union (IAU) on February 7, 2025. The crater is named for medieval Persian poet Mahsati Ganjavi.

The central peak complex of Mahsati has hollows.

To the northeast of Mahsati is Dali crater. To the southwest is the rayed crater Fonteyn, and to the southeast is the large basin Raditladi. An unnamed rimless depression south of Mahsati may be a site of explosive volcanism.
