= Seuss (crater) =

Crater on Mercury

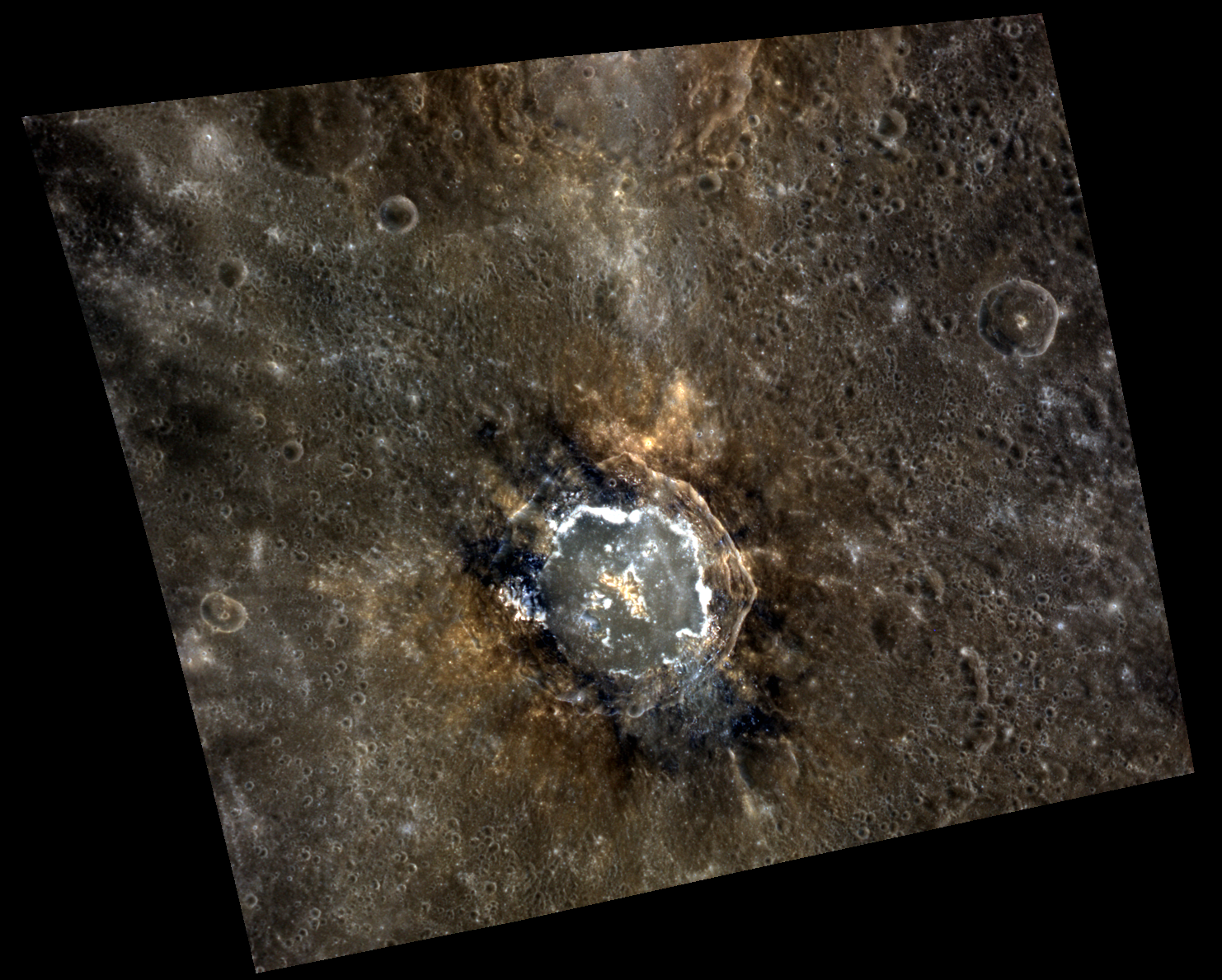
- MESSENGER WAC image in approximate color
- Planet: Mercury
- Coordinates: 7.65°N 326.84°W
- Quadrangle: Derain
- Diameter: 64 km (40 mi)
- Eponym: Dr. Seuss

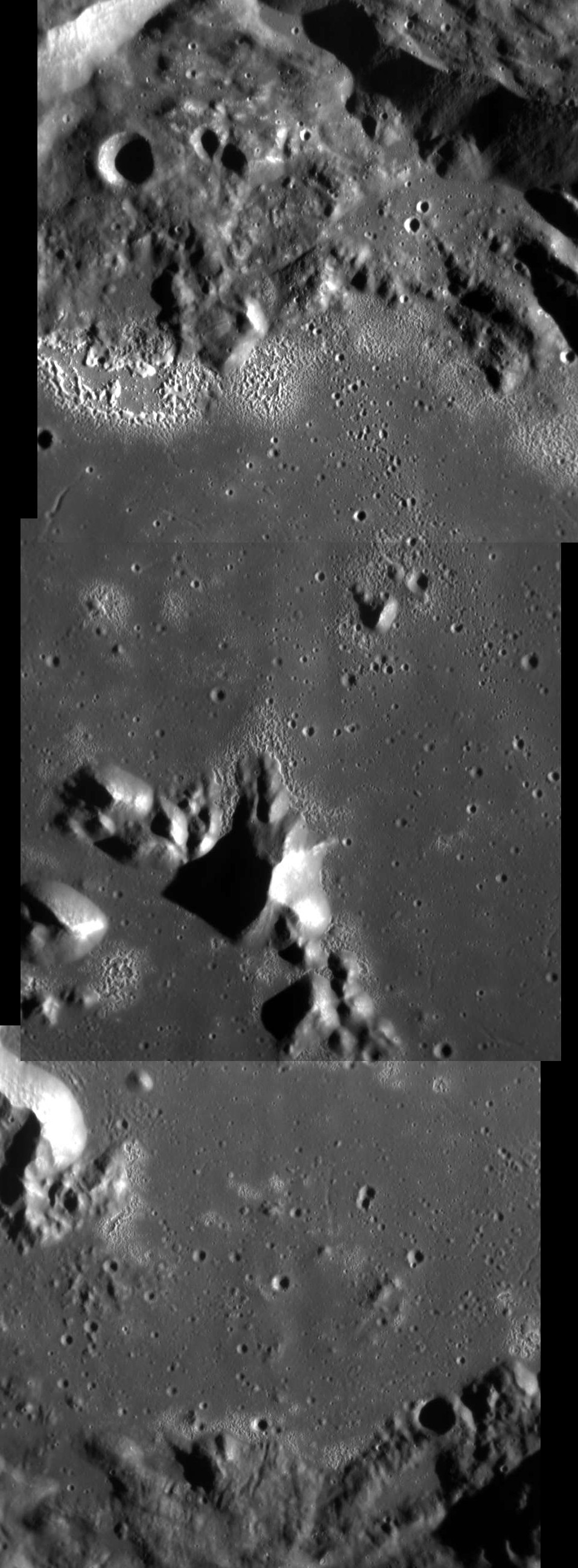
MESSENGER NAC mosaic, showing the hollows around the central peak and a prominent one along the north rim.

Seuss is a crater on Mercury. Its name was adopted by the International Astronomical Union (IAU) in 2012. It is named for the American author and cartoonist Theodor Seuss Geisel, better known as Dr. Seuss.

Seuss is one of the largest craters of the Kuiperian system on Mercury. The largest is Bartók crater.

Hollows are present within Seuss.

The Acadia Rupes is an escarpment located west of Seuss.

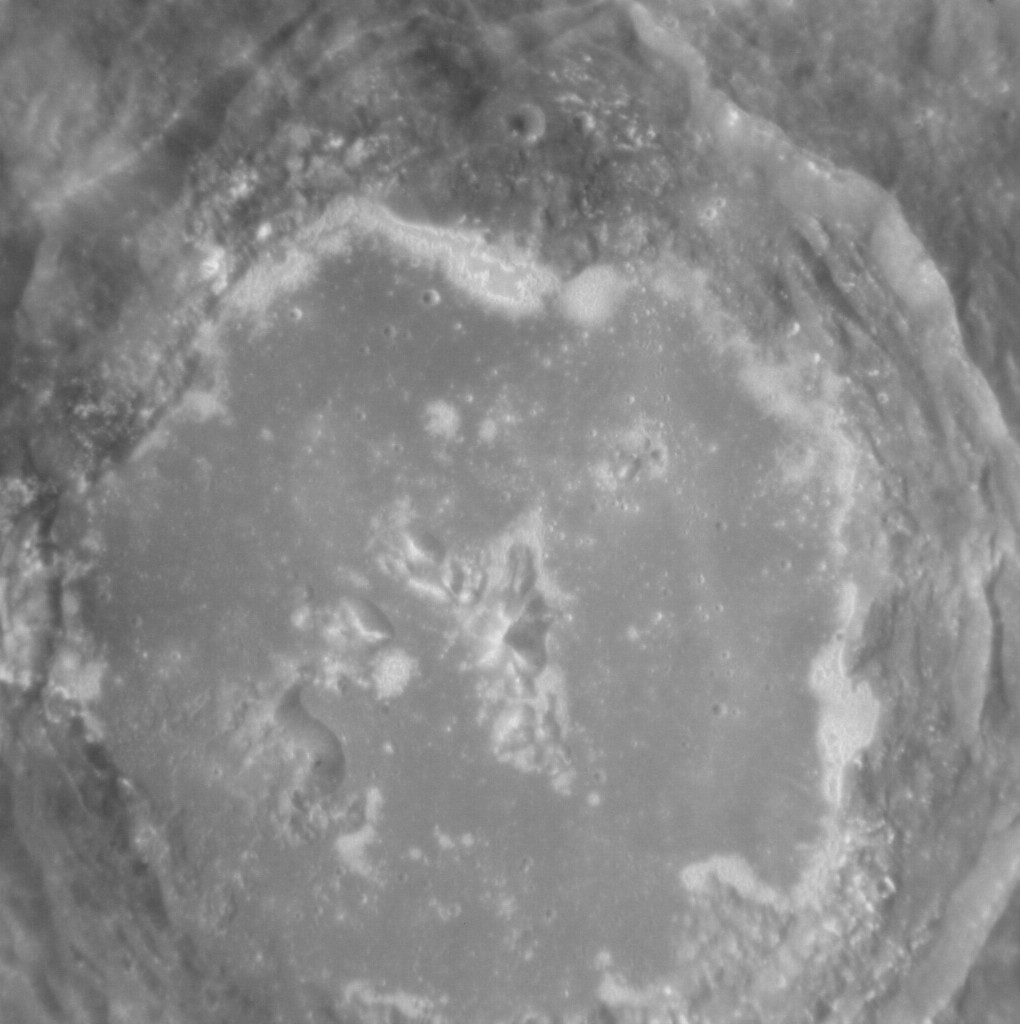
Another MESSENGER image showing the bright deposits, known as hollows, within the crater

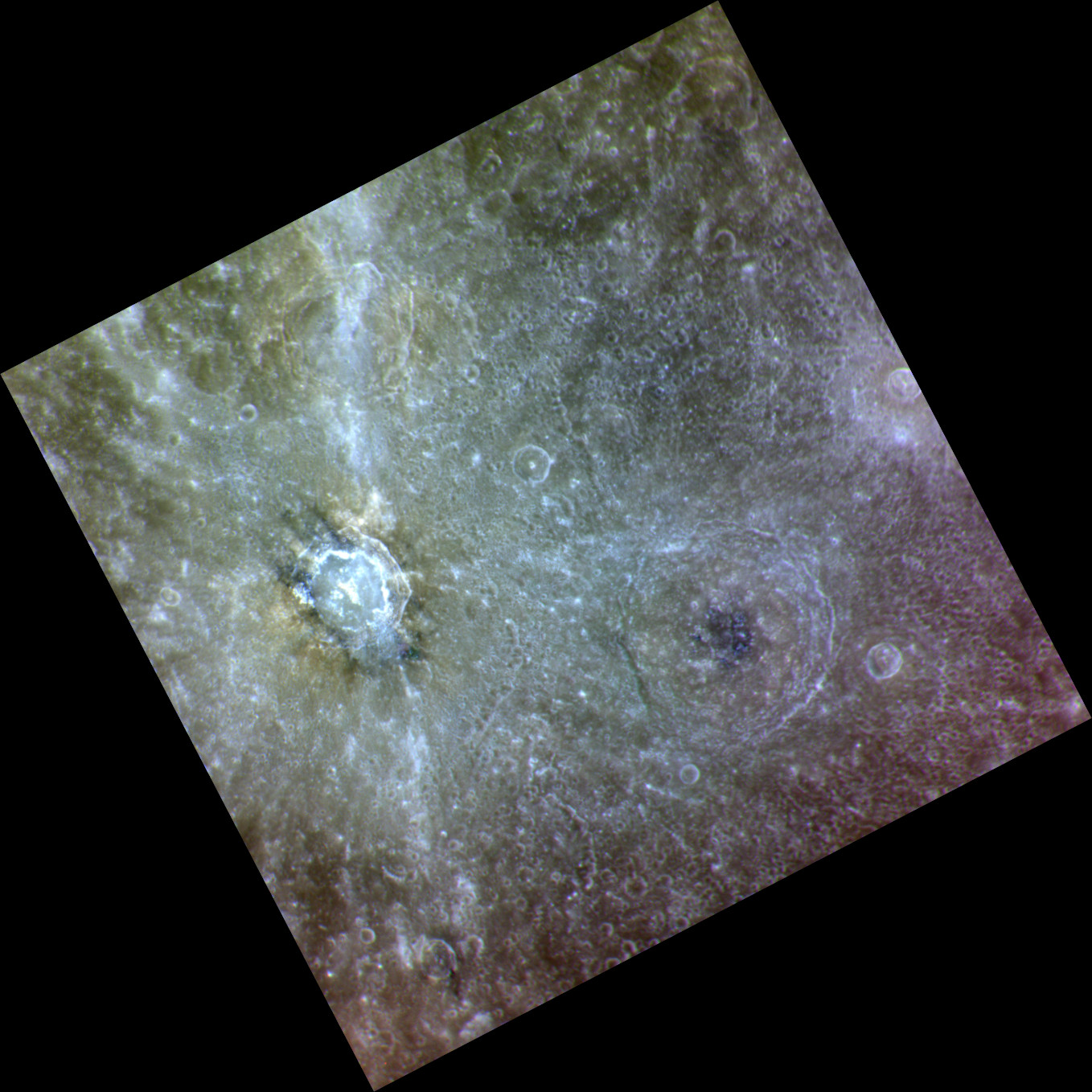
Regional view with Seuss at left and an unnamed crater with a dark central peak complex at right
