= Theophanes (crater) =

Crater on Mercury

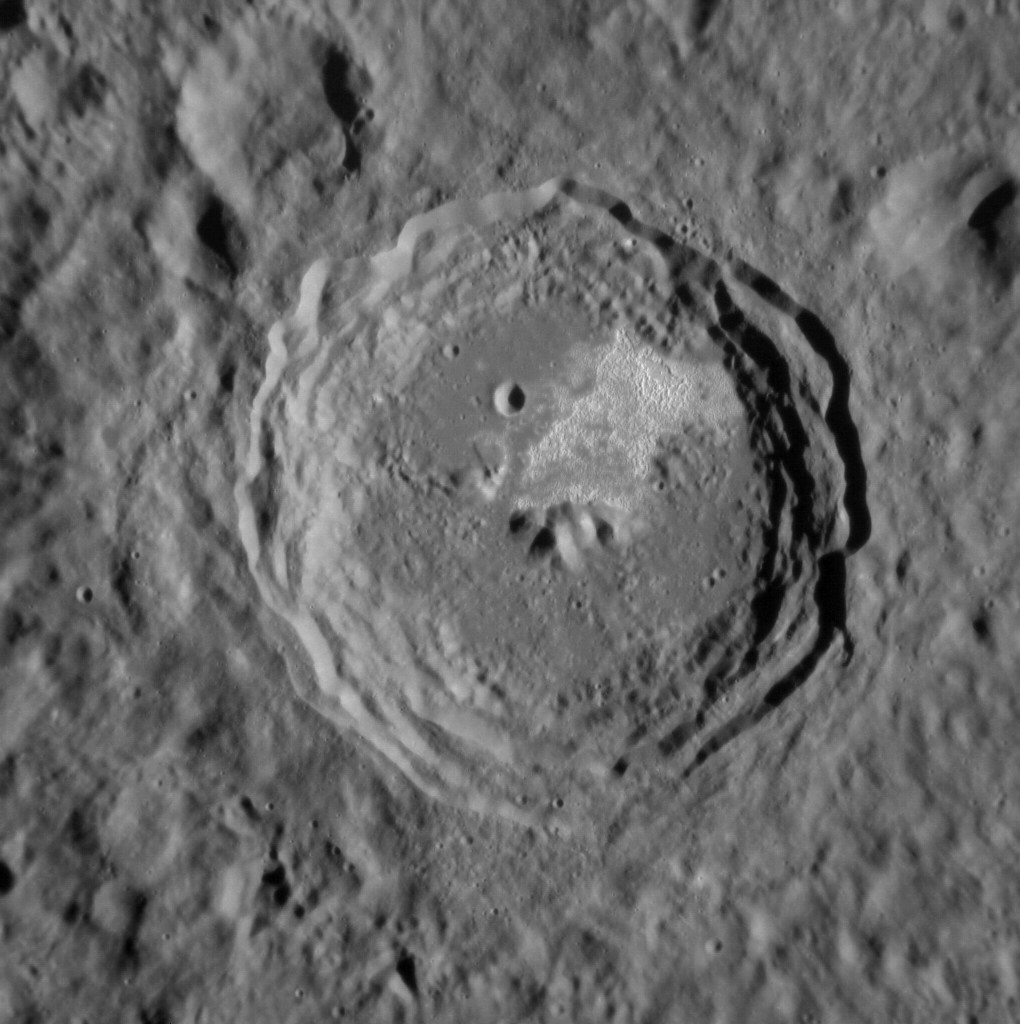
- MESSENGER NAC image
- Planet: Mercury
- Coordinates: 5.02°S 142.78°W
- Quadrangle: Beethoven
- Diameter: 46 km (29 mi)
- Eponym: Theophanes

Theophanes is a crater on Mercury. Its name was adopted by the IAU in 1976, after the Byzantine painter Theophanes.

Hollows are present within Theophanes and to the west of the crater.

Two unnamed depressions east of Theophanes may be sites of explosive volcanism.

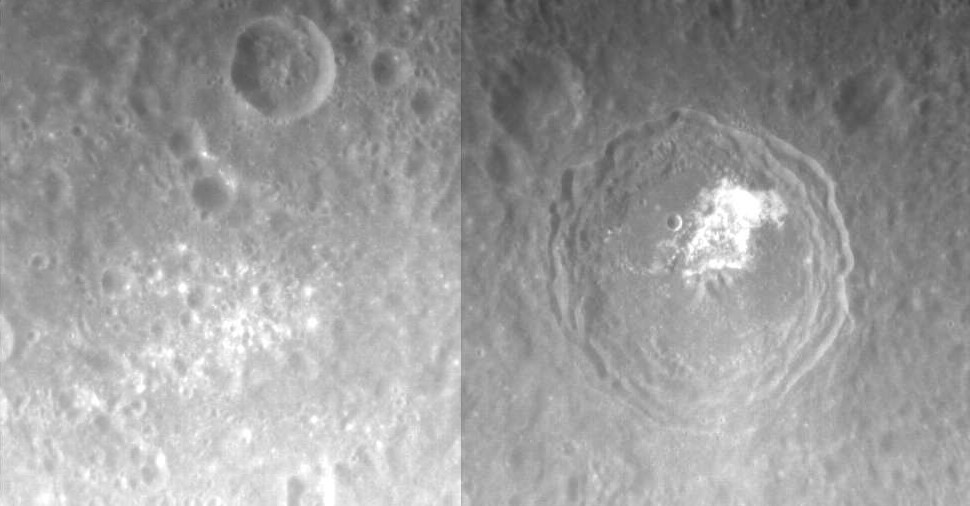
Theophanes crater and hollows to the west

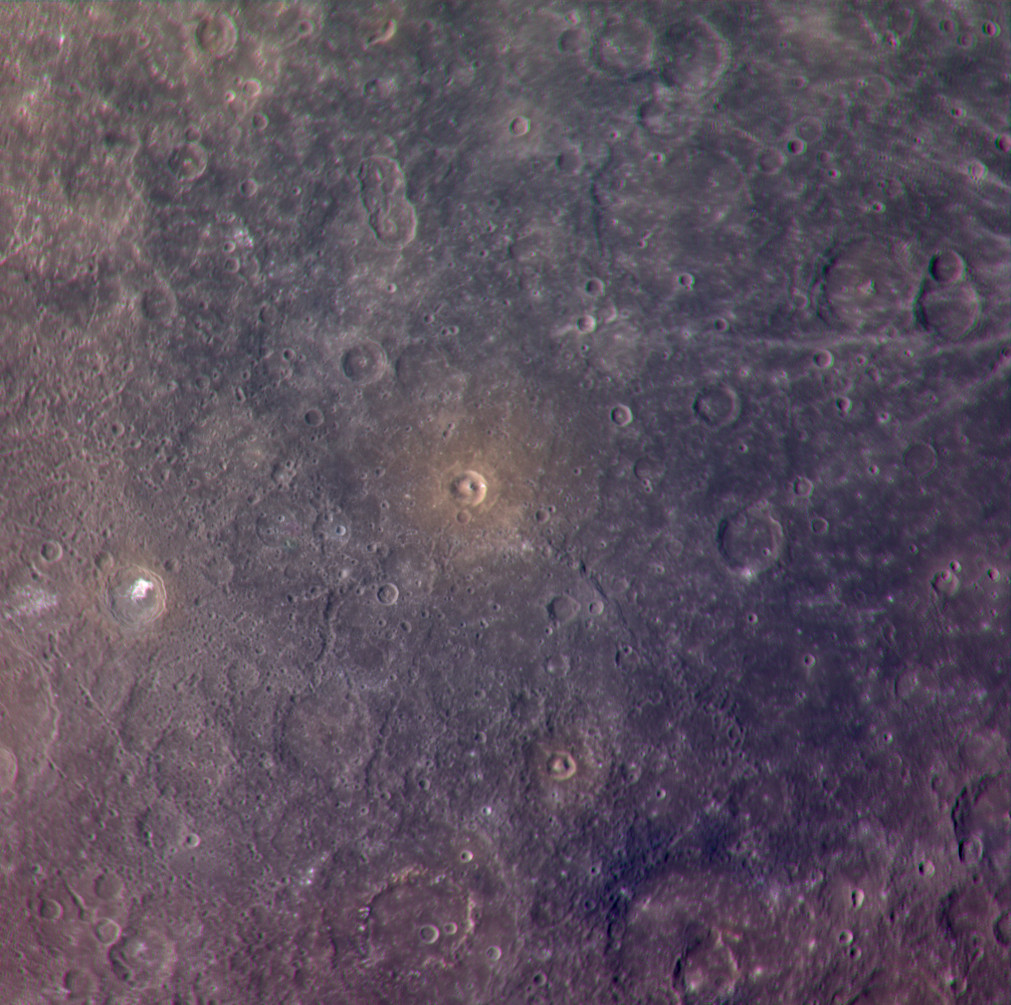
Theophanes at left, with two probable sites of explosive volcanism at center and below center
