= Darío (crater) =

Crater on Mercury

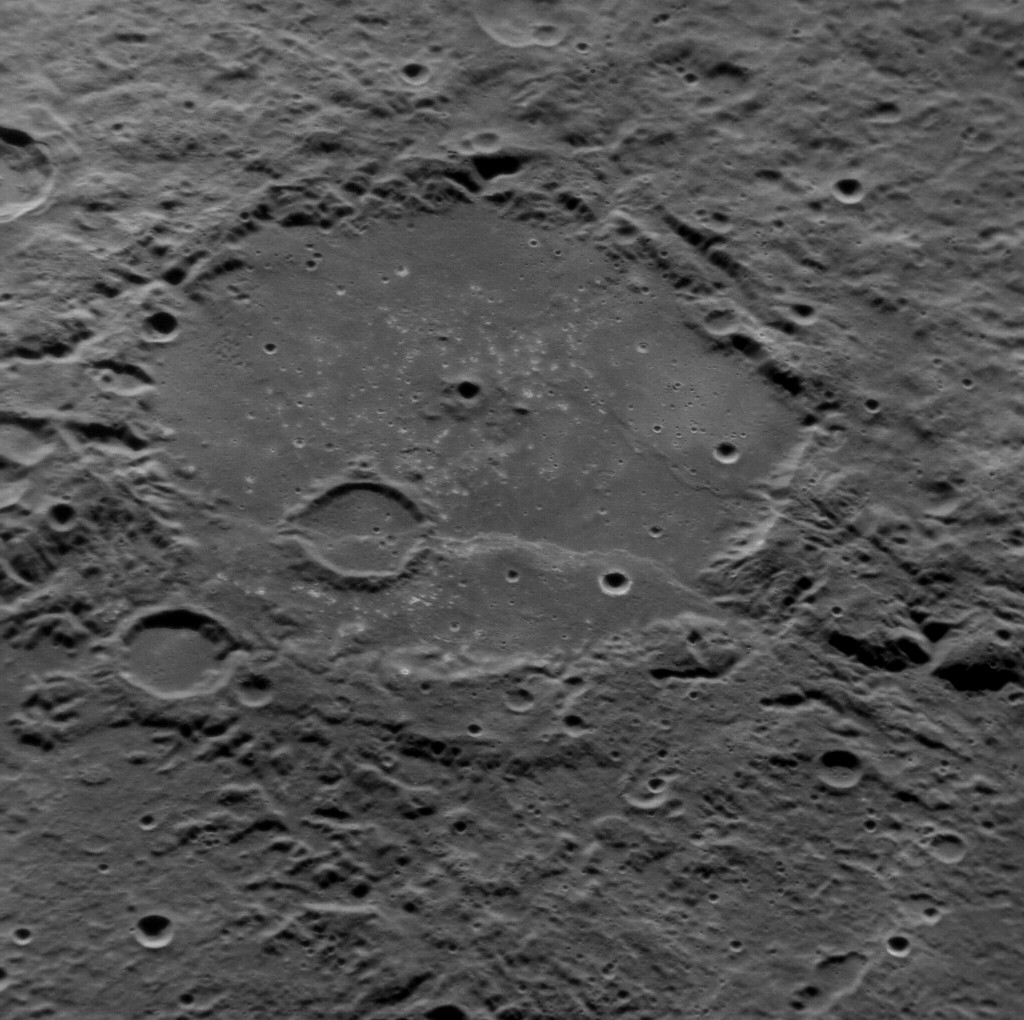
- MESSENGER NAC image centered on Darío
- Feature type: Impact crater
- Location: Discovery quadrangle, Mercury
- Coordinates: 26.28°S 9.51°W
- Diameter: 151 km (94 mi)
- Eponym: Rubén Darío

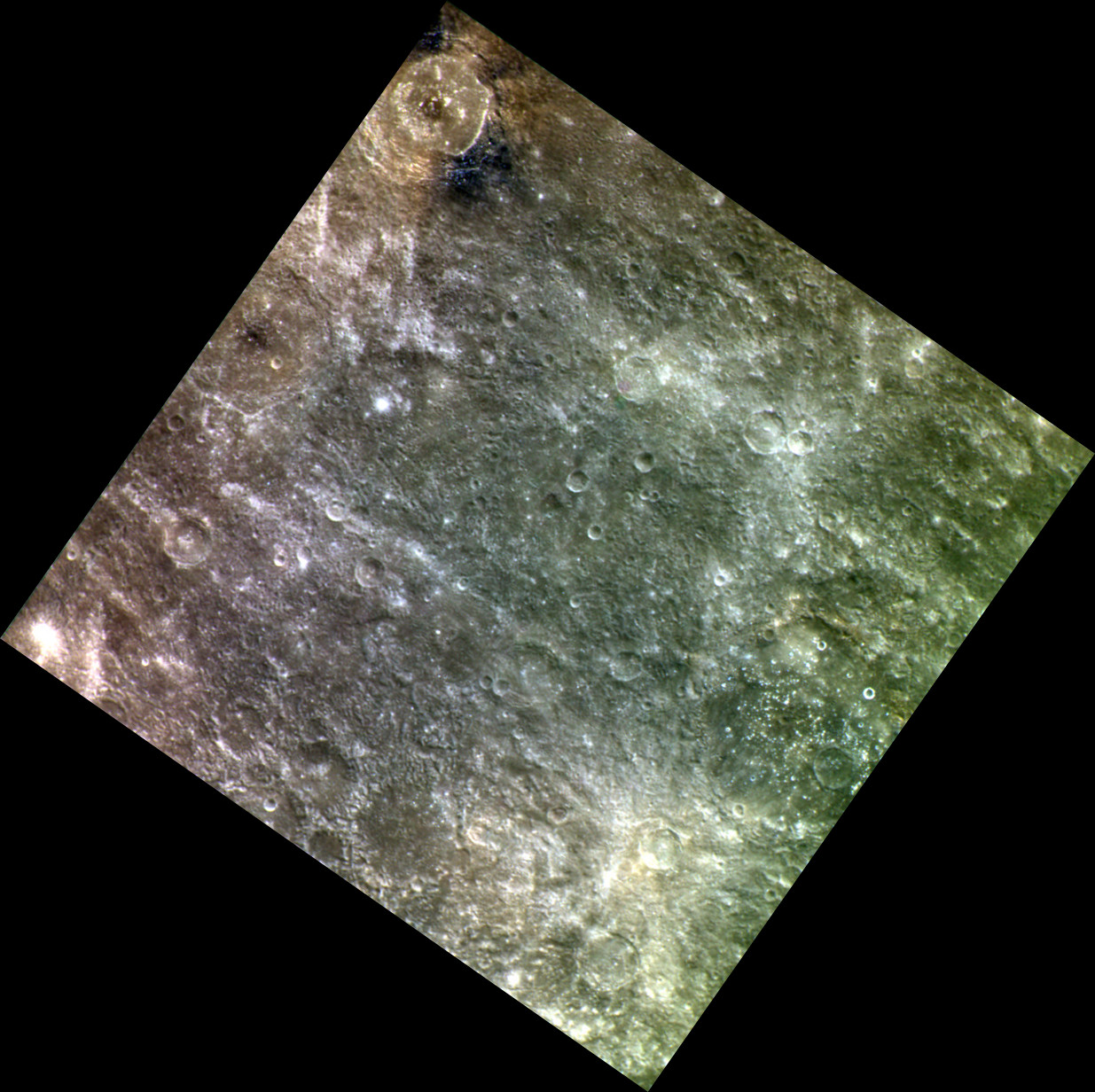
Regional approximate color view by MESSENGER, with Darío along lower right margin

Darío is a crater on Mercury. It has a diameter of 151 kilometers. Its name was adopted by the International Astronomical Union (IAU) in 1976. Dario is named for the Nicaraguan poet Rubén Darío, who lived from 1867 to 1916. The crater was first imaged by Mariner 10 in 1974.

Darío lies on the western rim of the much larger Aneirin crater. The highest of several scarps that cut across the floor of Darío corresponds with the rim of Aneirin.

== Hollows ==
Hollows are present within Darío, scattered across the crater floor.

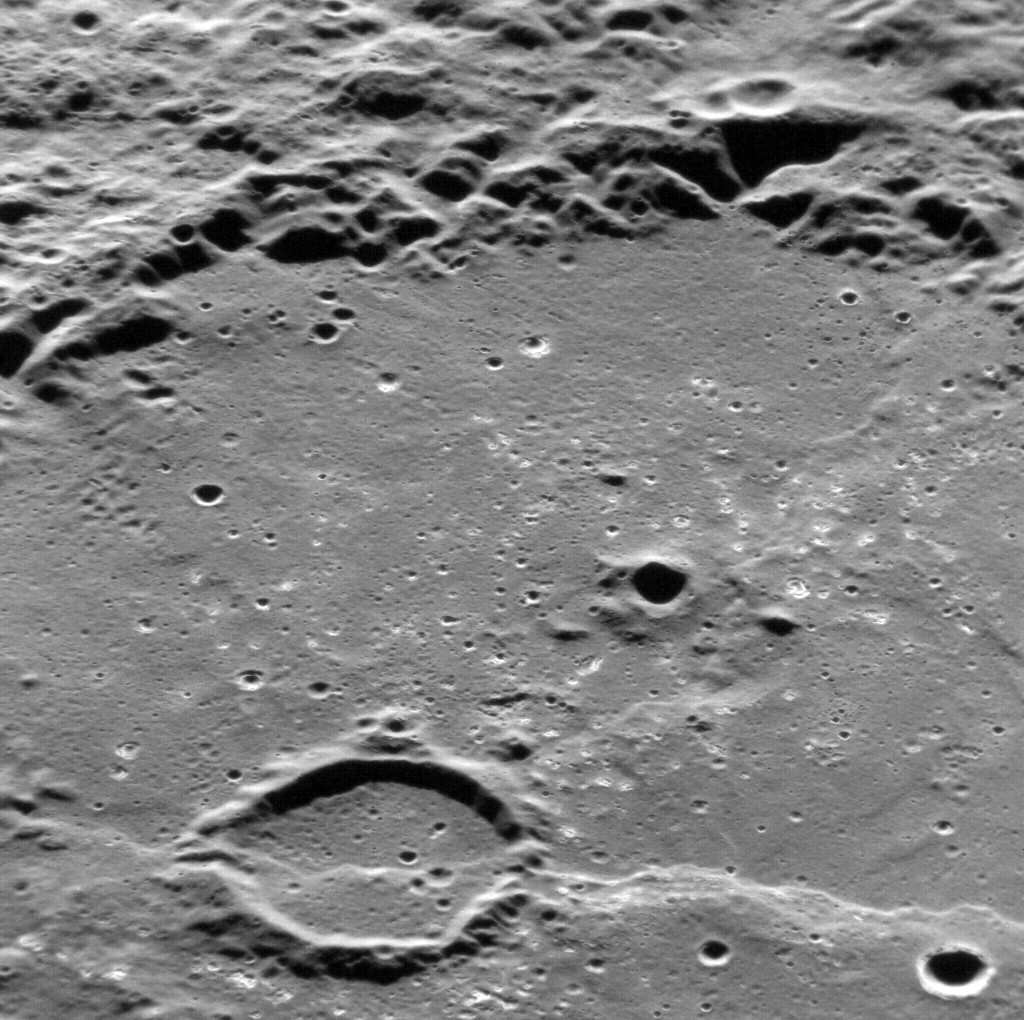
View at low sun angle. Small depressions are hollows.

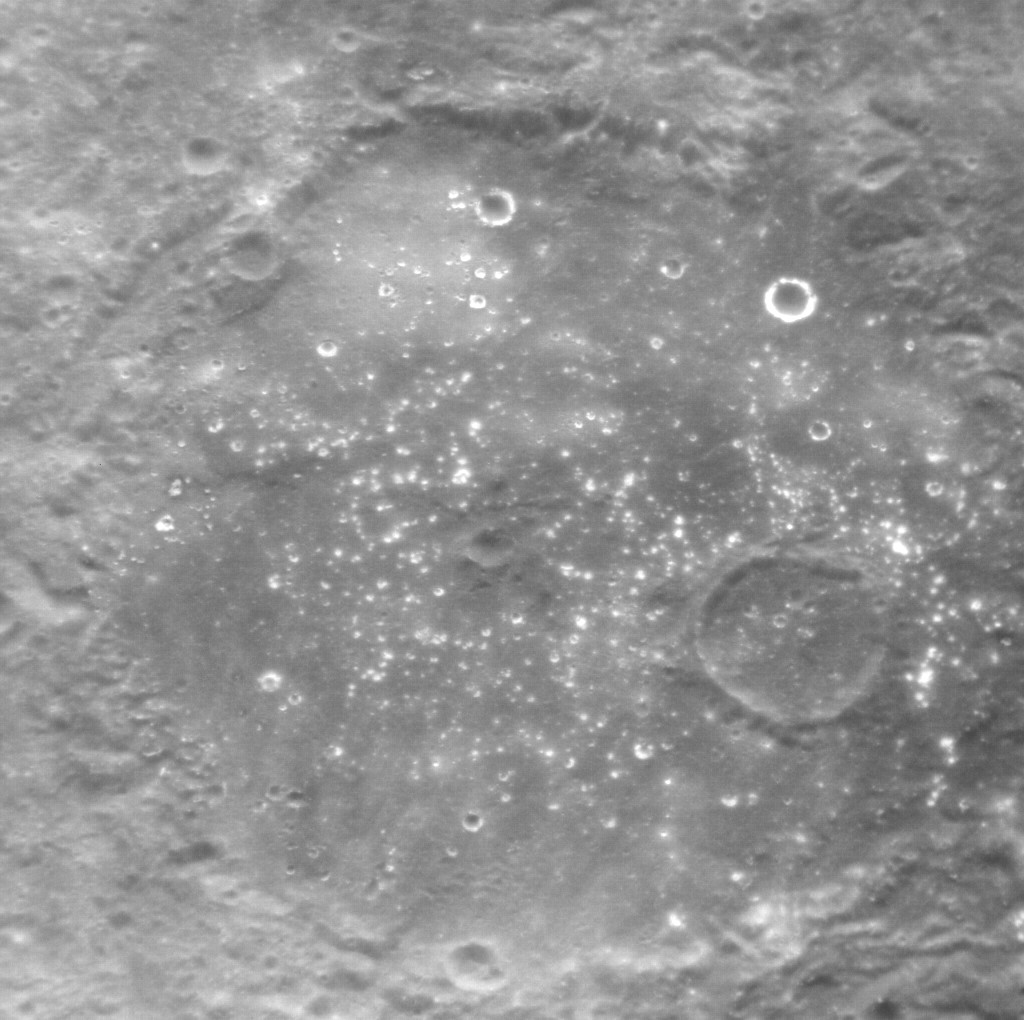
View at high sun angle. Bright spots are hollows.
