= Sontag (crater) =

Crater on Mercury

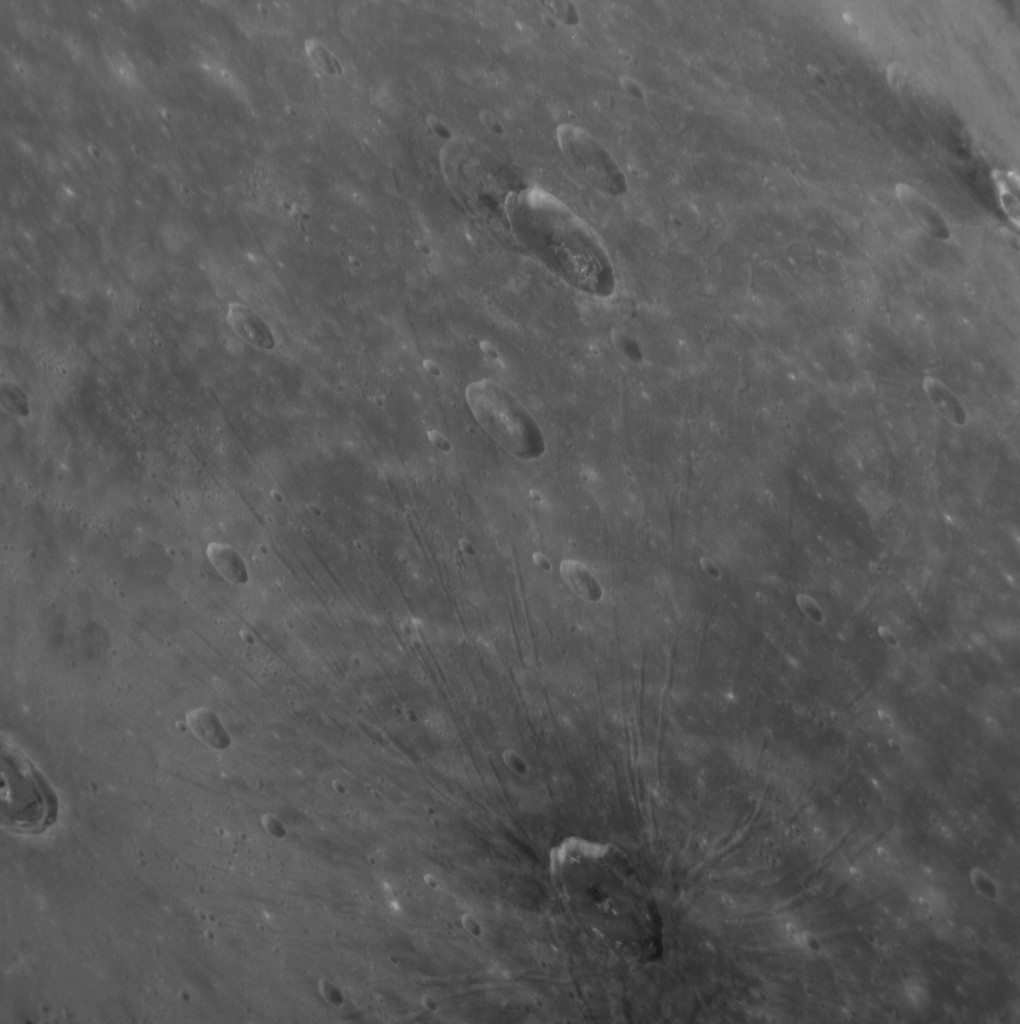
- MESSENGER NAC from first flyby in January 2008, with Sontag at top center
- Planet: Mercury
- Coordinates: 36.59°N 193.34°W
- Quadrangle: Raditladi
- Diameter: 41 km (25 mi)
- Eponym: Susan Sontag

Sontag is a crater on Mercury. Its name was adopted by the International Astronomical Union (IAU) on August 13, 2024, for the American novelist and essayist Susan Sontag, who lived from 1933 to 2004.

Sontag lies within Caloris Planitia, northeast of the center of the basin.

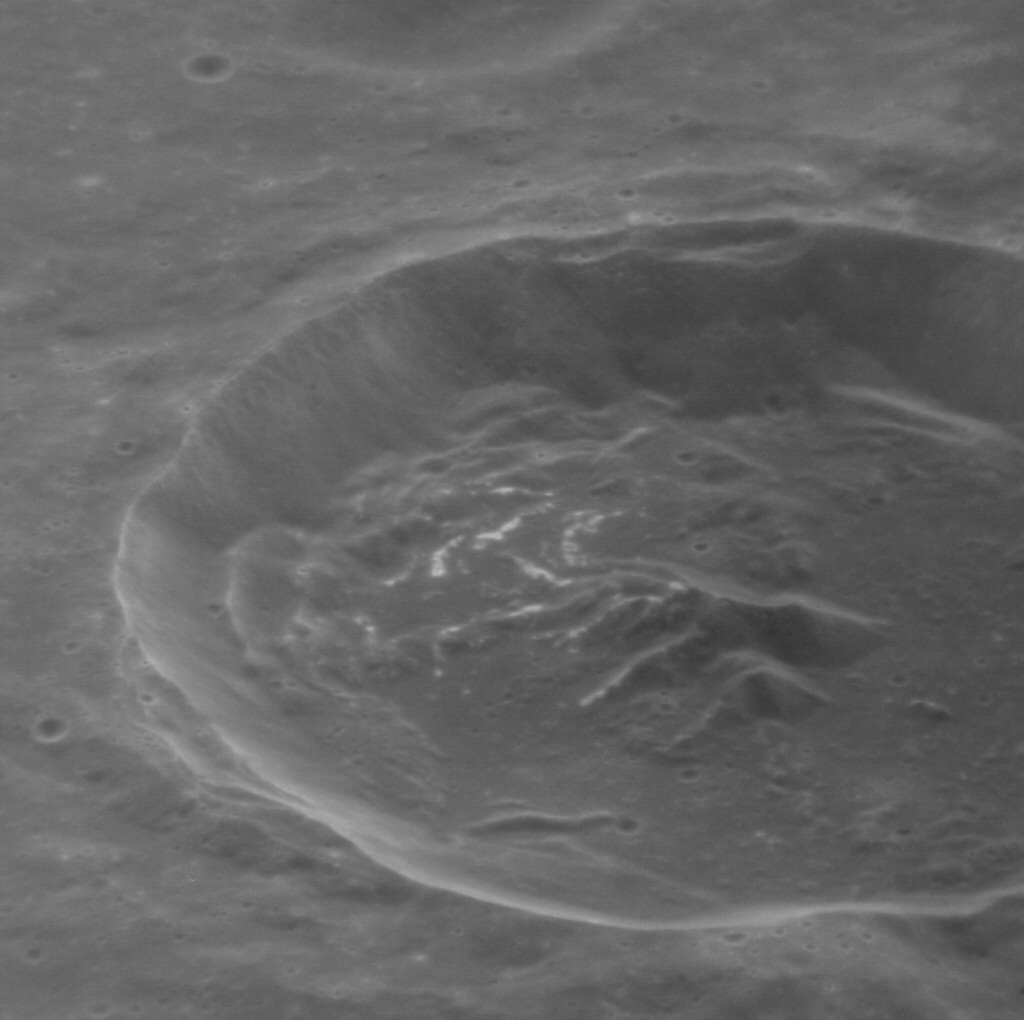
Sontag crater, with hollows at center

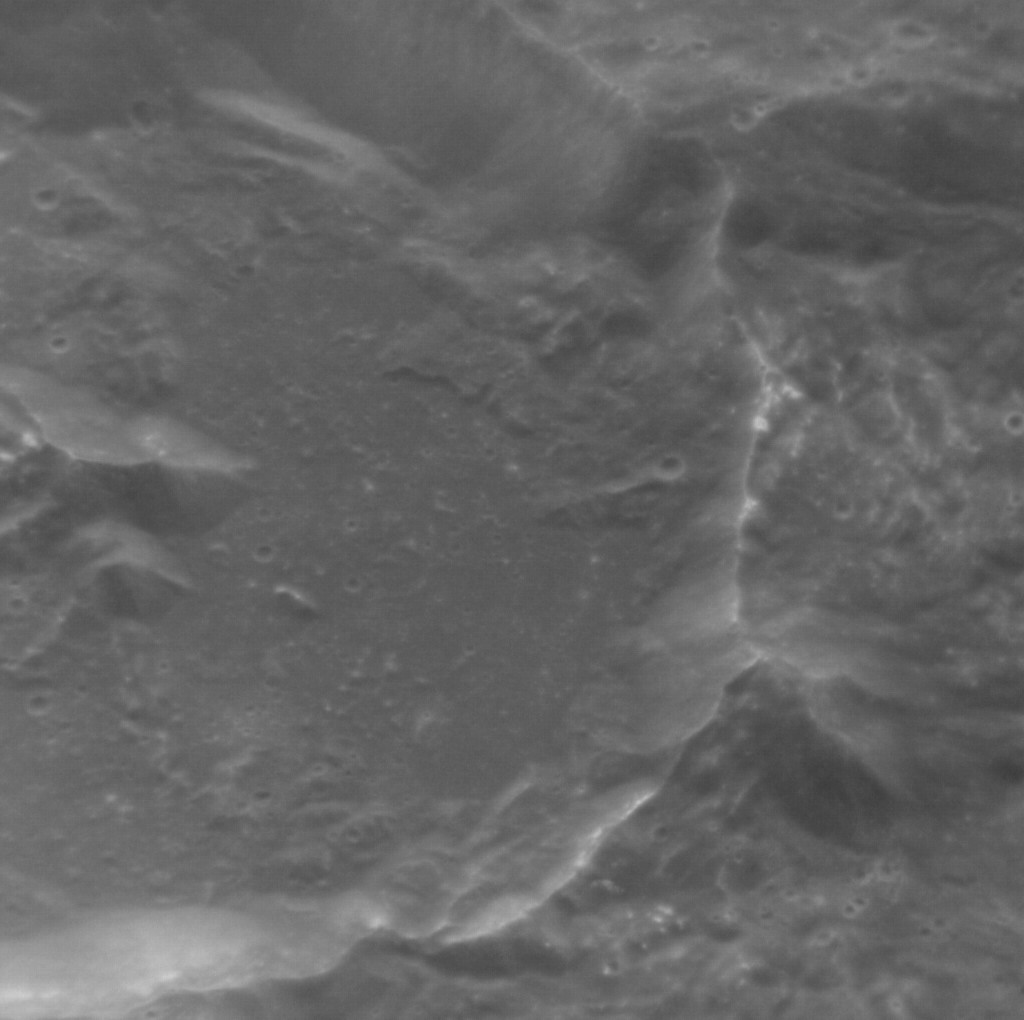
Sontag crater including its border with the unnamed crater to the northwest
