= Balzac (crater) =

Crater on Mercury

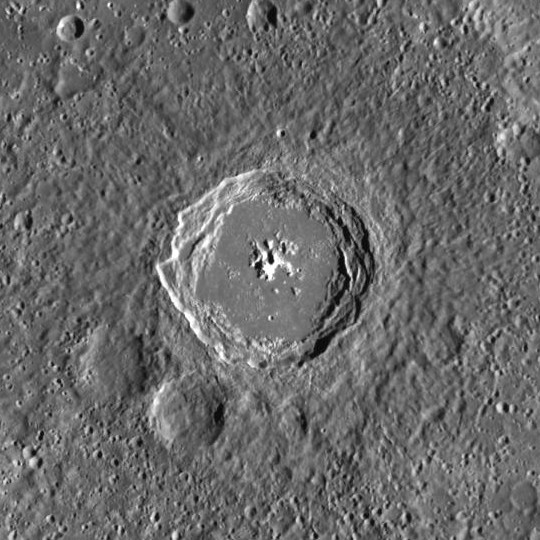
- MESSENGER WAC mosaic of Balzac
- Feature type: Central-peak impact crater
- Location: Tolstoj quadrangle, Mercury
- Coordinates: 10.62°N 144.67°W
- Diameter: 67 km (42 mi)
- Eponym: Honoré de Balzac

Balzac is a crater on Mercury. Its name was adopted by the International Astronomical Union in 1976. Balzac is named for the French writer Honoré de Balzac, who lived from 1799 to 1850. The crater was first imaged by Mariner 10 in 1974.

Balzac is one of the largest craters of the Kuiperian system on Mercury. The largest is Bartók crater.

Hollows are present within Balzac.

== Views ==
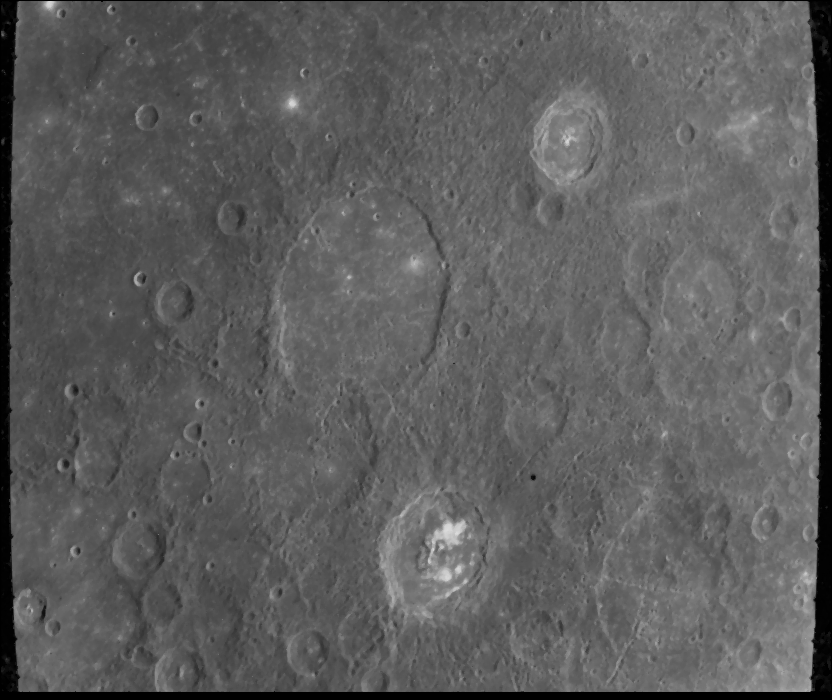
Mariner 10 image with Balzac in upper right

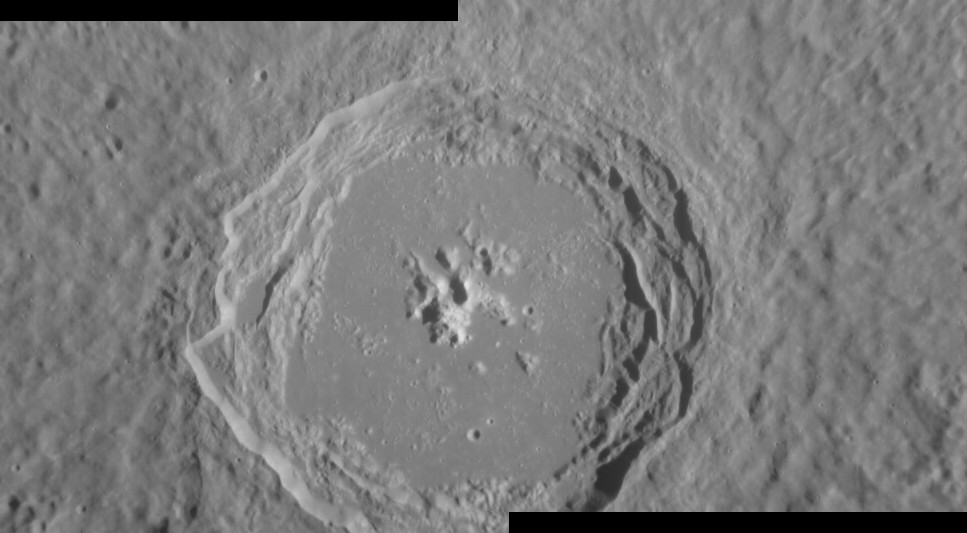
MESSENGER mosaic

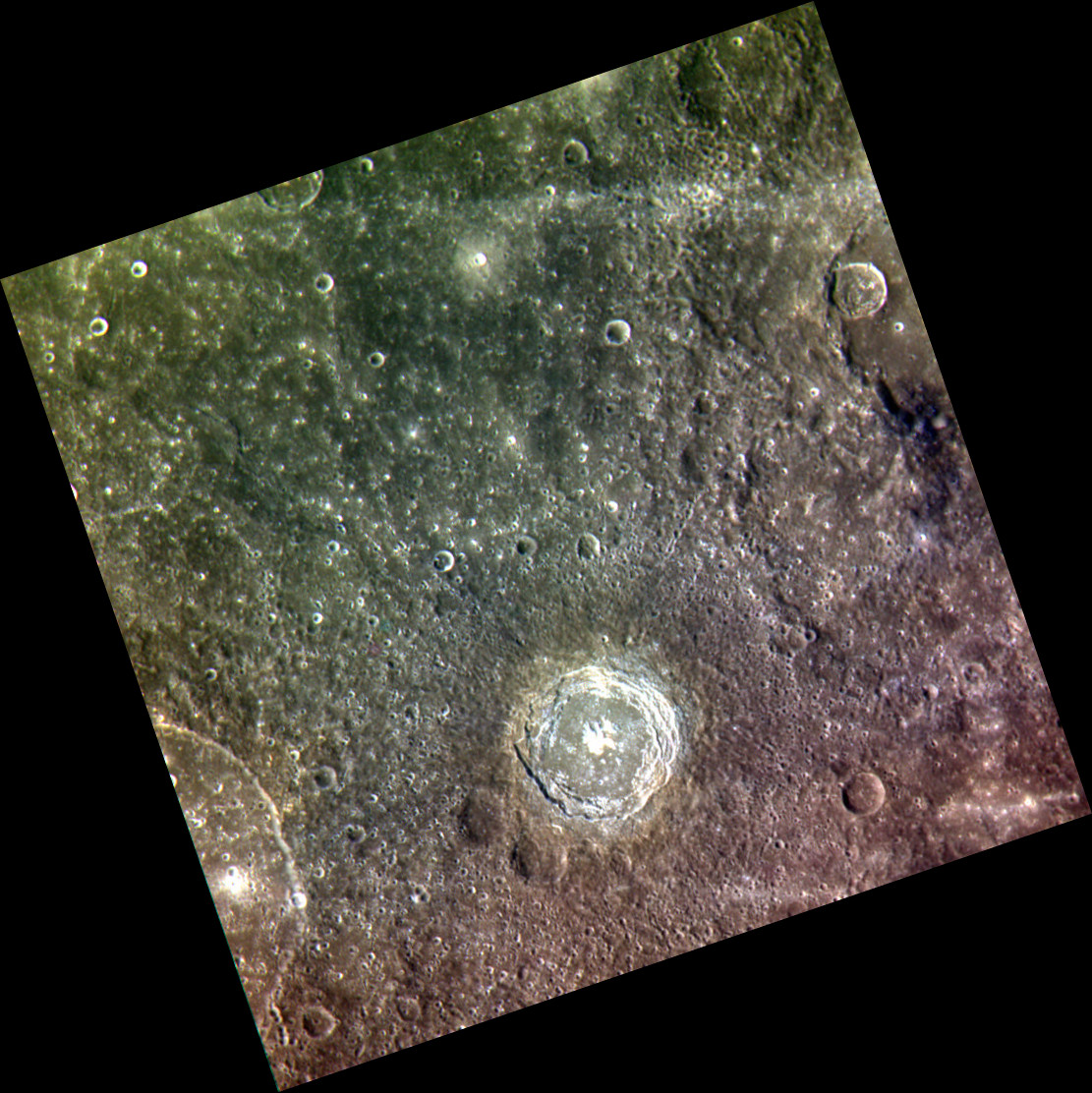
Approximate color image of Balzac crater

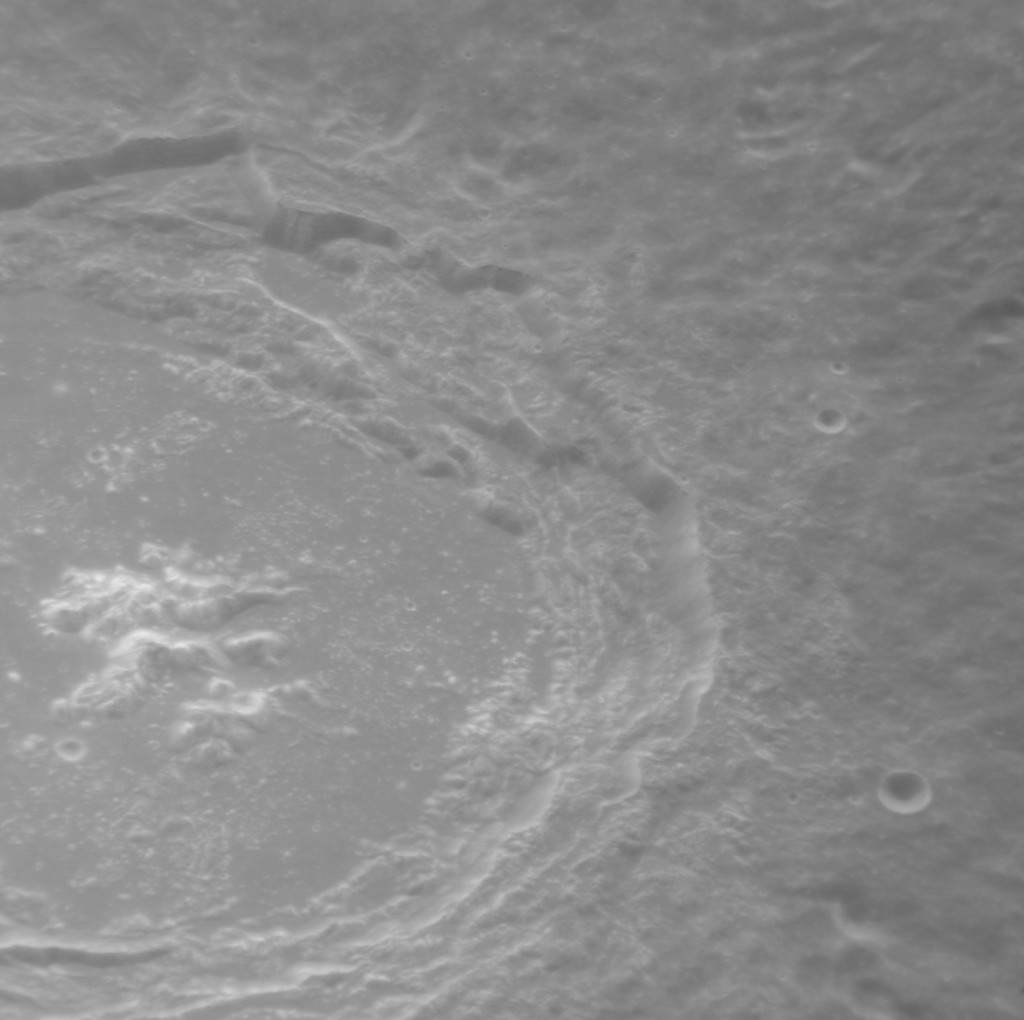
Oblique view of northern Balzac
