= Warhol (crater) =

Crater on Mercury

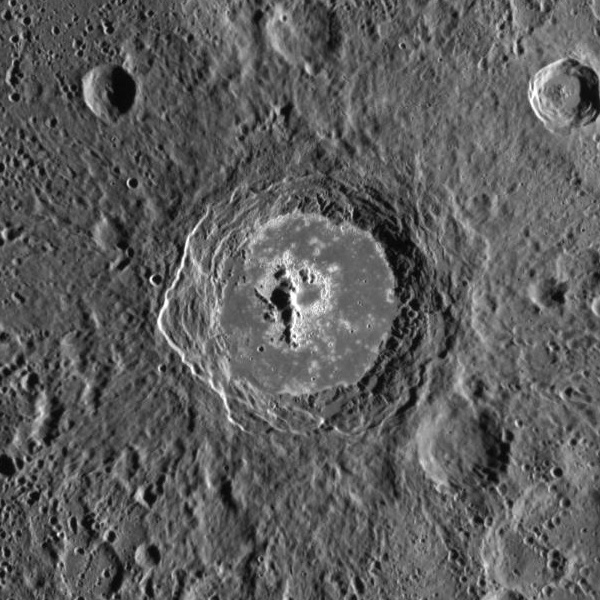
- MESSENGER WAC mosaic
- Planet: Mercury
- Coordinates: 2.55°S 6.27°W
- Quadrangle: Kuiper
- Diameter: 91 km
- Eponym: Andy Warhol

Warhol is a crater on Mercury. Its name was adopted by the IAU in 2012, after the American artist Andy Warhol.

Hollows are abundant within Warhol.

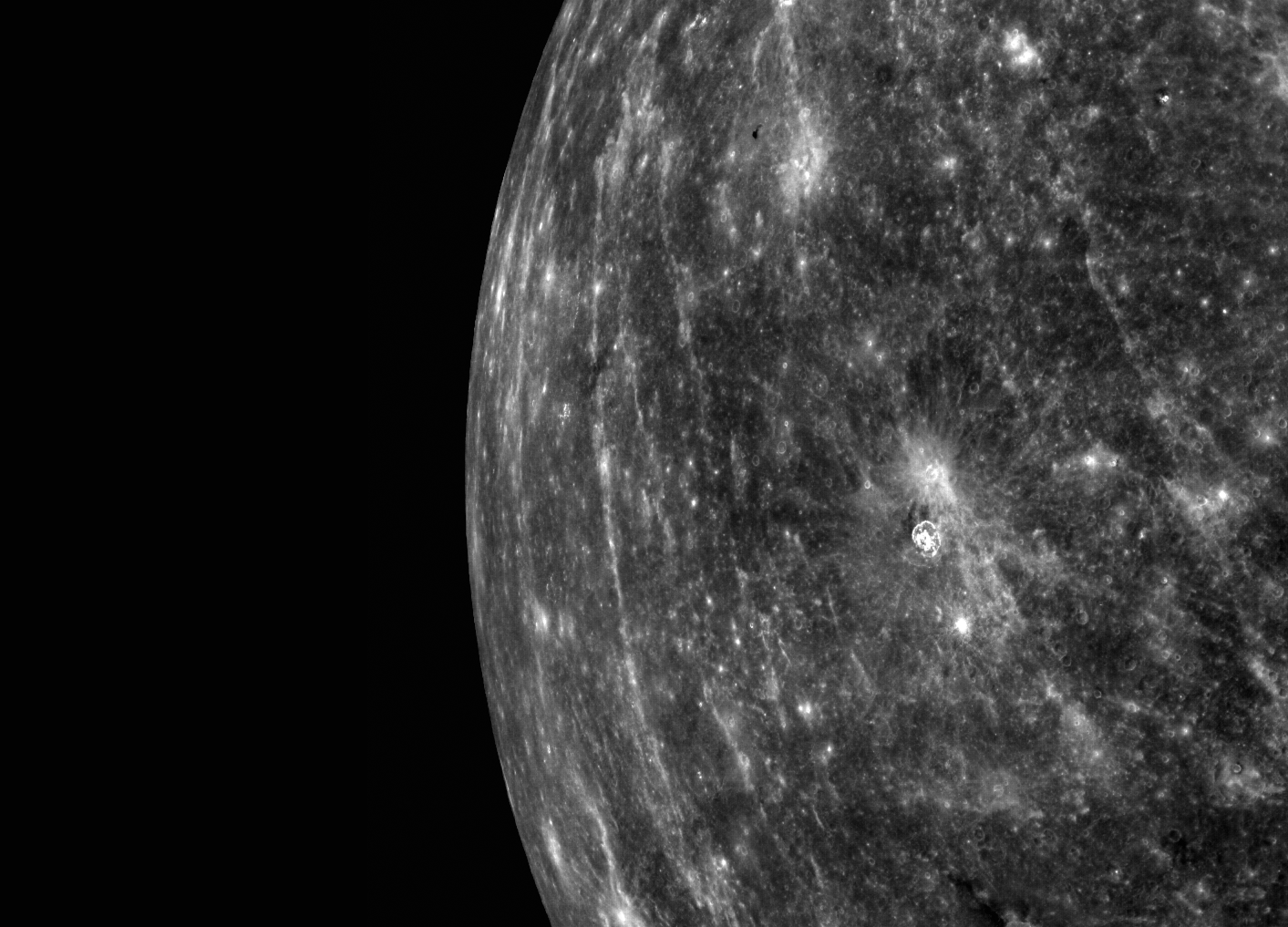
View of Mercury's limb at a high sun angle, with Warhol as the bright crater near center

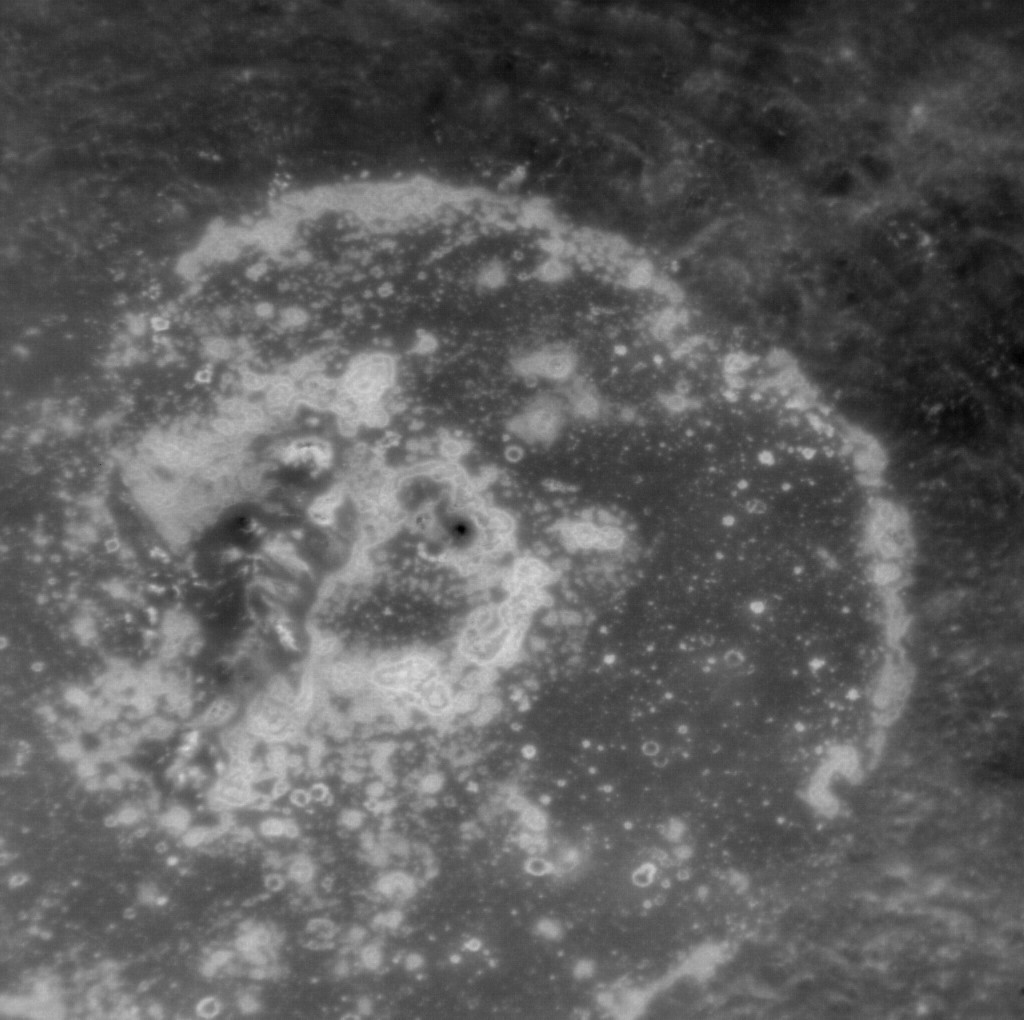
Closeup of Warhol at high sun angle showing the abundant hollows on the crater floor (MESSENGER NAC)

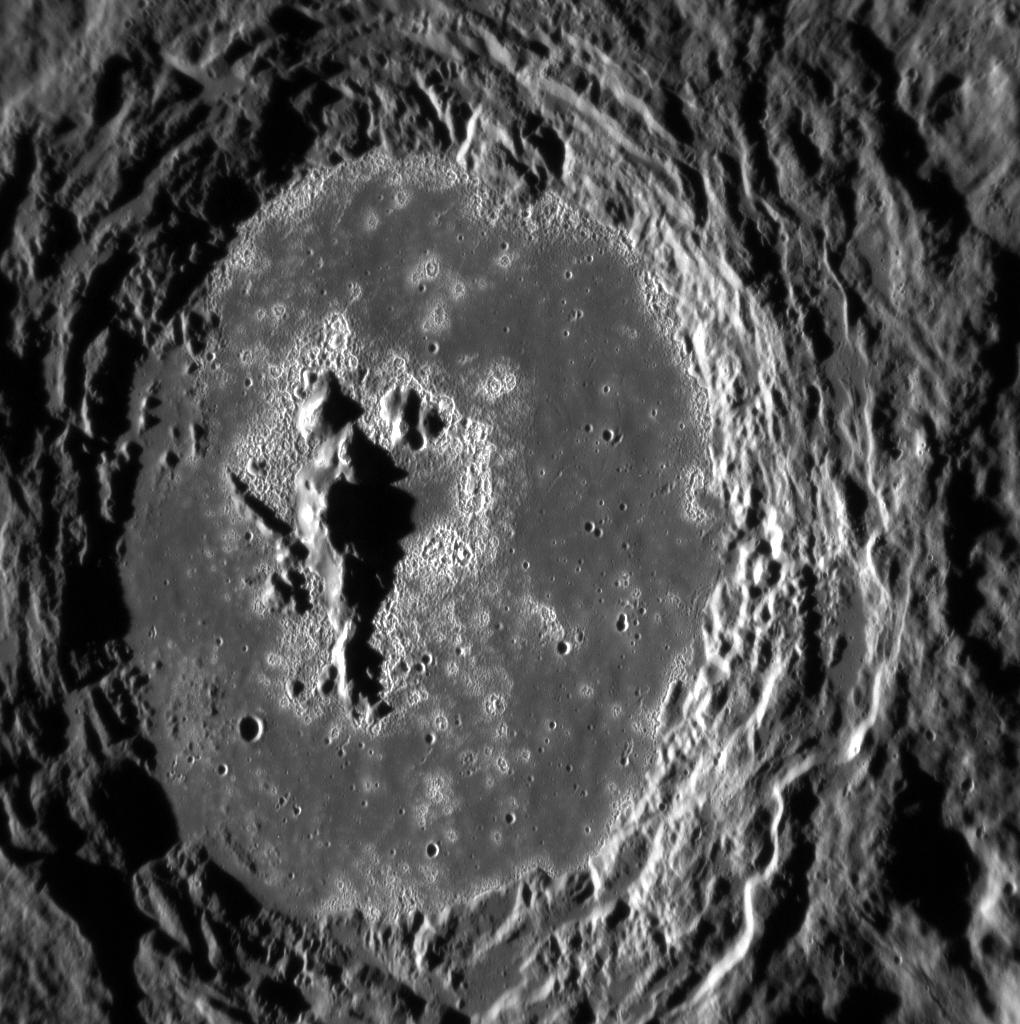
Another closeup of Warhol (MESSENGER NAC)
