= Aneirin (crater) =

Crater on Mercury

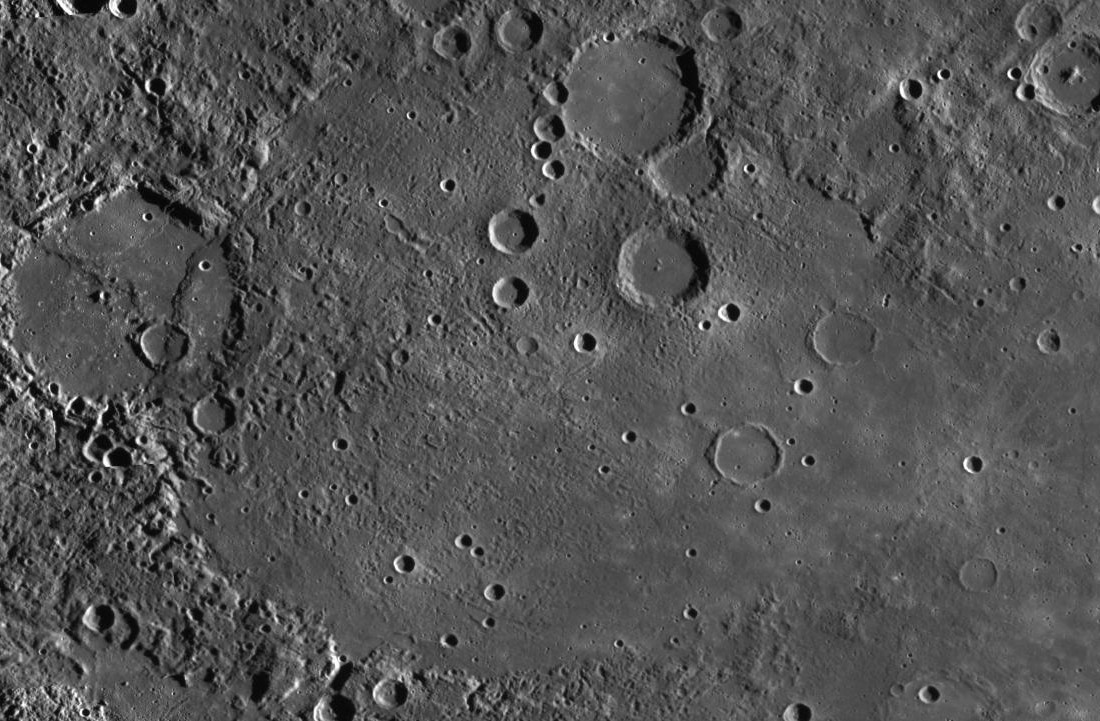
- MESSENGER WAC mosaic
- Feature type: Impact crater
- Location: Discovery quadrangle, Mercury
- Coordinates: 27.47°S 2.68°W
- Diameter: 467 km (290 mi)
- Eponym: Aneirin

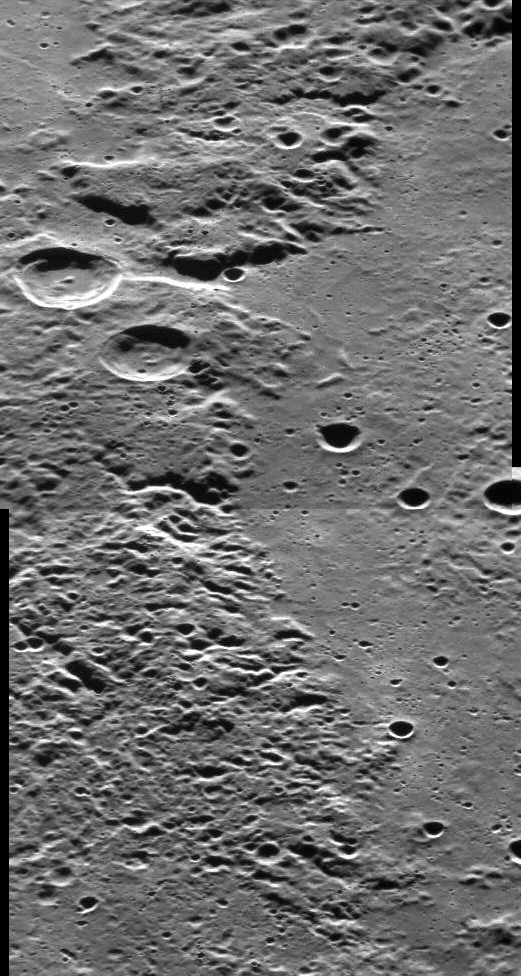
Southern rim of Aneirin

Aneirin is a crater on Mercury. It has a diameter of 467 kilometers. Its name was adopted by the International Astronomical Union (IAU) on June 13, 2014. Aneirin is named for the Welsh poet Aneirin. Prior to naming, the crater was referred to as b37. It is Tolstojan in age.

Darío crater lies on the western rim of Aneirin. The lobate scarp that cuts across Darío lies along the rim of Aneirin, an unusual situation suggesting that the scarp indicates a zone of weakness extending to a depth of tens of kilometers along the original floor of Aneirin.
