= Hopper (crater) =

Crater on Mercury

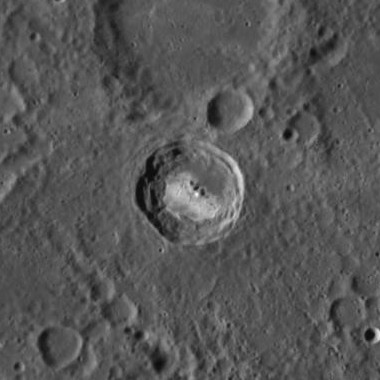
- MESSENGER WAC mosaic
- Planet: Mercury
- Coordinates: 12.44°S 55.96°W
- Quadrangle: Kuiper
- Diameter: 36 km (22 mi)
- Eponym: Edward Hopper

Hopper is a crater on Mercury. Its name was adopted by the IAU in 2012, after the American painter Edward Hopper. The crater was first imaged by Mariner 10 in 1974.

Hollows are present within Hopper, which are as bright as the crater Kuiper.

== Views ==
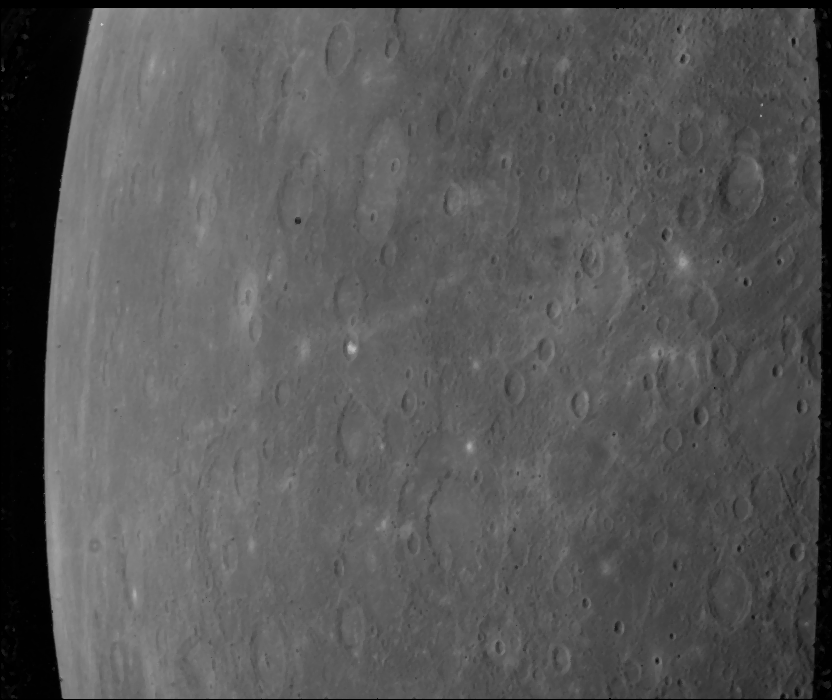
Mariner 10 image centered on Hopper

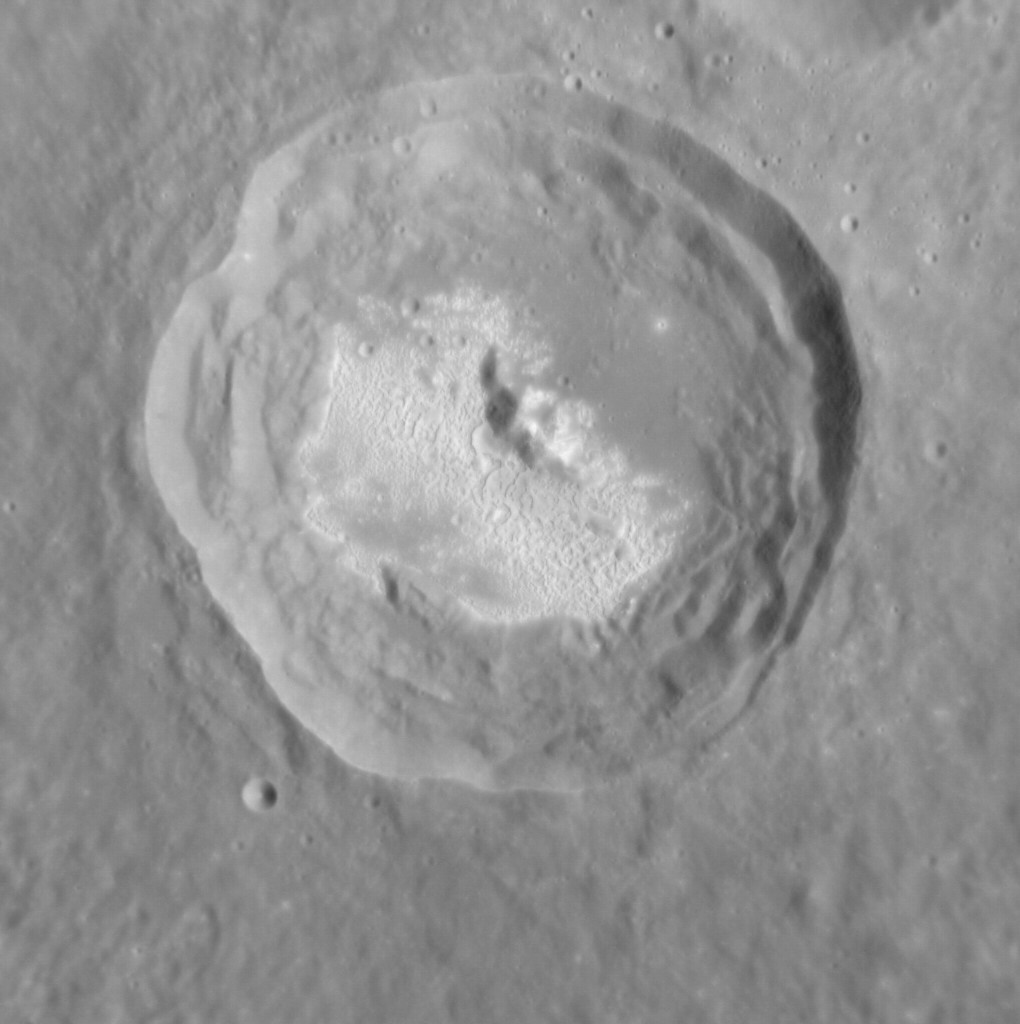
High-resolution image from MESSENGER

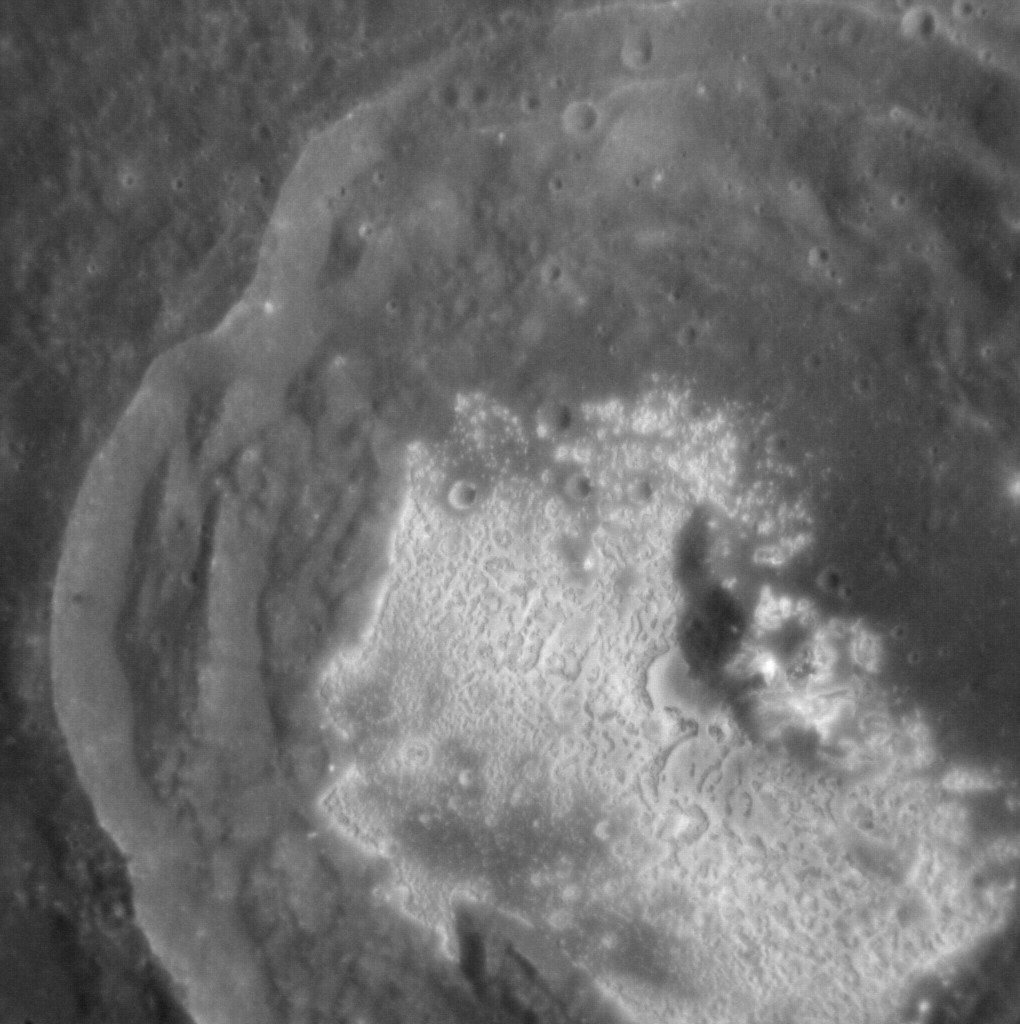
The highest resolution view from MESSENGER showing the detail of the hollows
