= Hollows (Mercury) =

Landform on the planet Mercury

Hollows are a landform on the planet Mercury, discovered during the MESSENGER mission that orbited the planet from 2011 to 2015.

Hollows are typically clusters of rimless depressions with flat floors and haloes of bright (high albedo) material surrounding them. Hollows are thought to form by loss of volatiles from the surface by sublimation, caused by the intense solar radiation on the airless planet. They are some of the youngest features on Mercury.

Hollows were first observed as bright areas within craters imaged by the Mariner 10 spacecraft in 1974, but the images were not of sufficient resolution to discern any detail. These craters include Balzac, Tyagaraja, Theophanes, Zeami, and Hopper.

The MESSENGER spacecraft imaged the rest of the planet, much of it at higher resolution and in color, leading to the discovery of hollows and clues about their formation and nature. Other craters where hollows are present include Warhol, Xiao Zhao, Seuss, Wergeland, Raditladi, Sholem Aleichem, Lermontov, Darío, and Scarlatti. Kertész, Sander, Sontag, Nāwahī, and Balanchine are craters with hollows within the Caloris basin. There are many other examples, and some hollows occur on the plains between craters (see Canova crater).

== Views ==
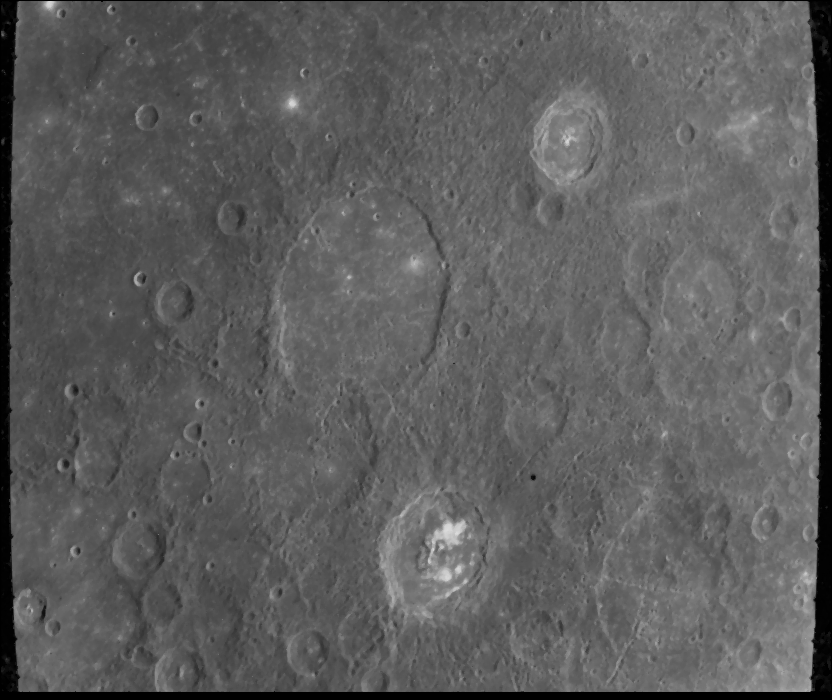
Mariner 10 image with Tyagaraja at bottom and Balzac in upper right.

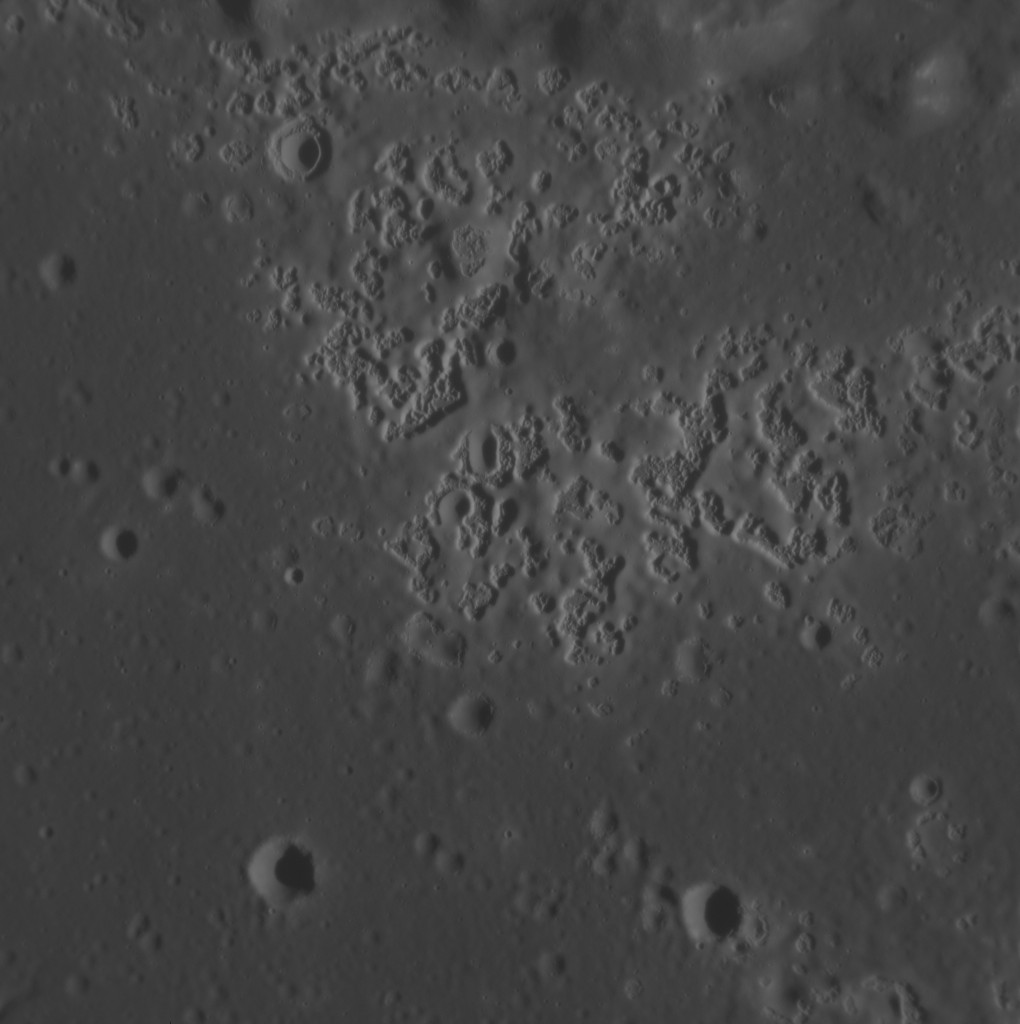
Hollows in Zeami crater. Image width is about 23.2 km.

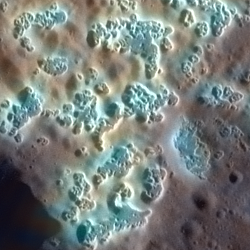
Hollows in Raditladi crater

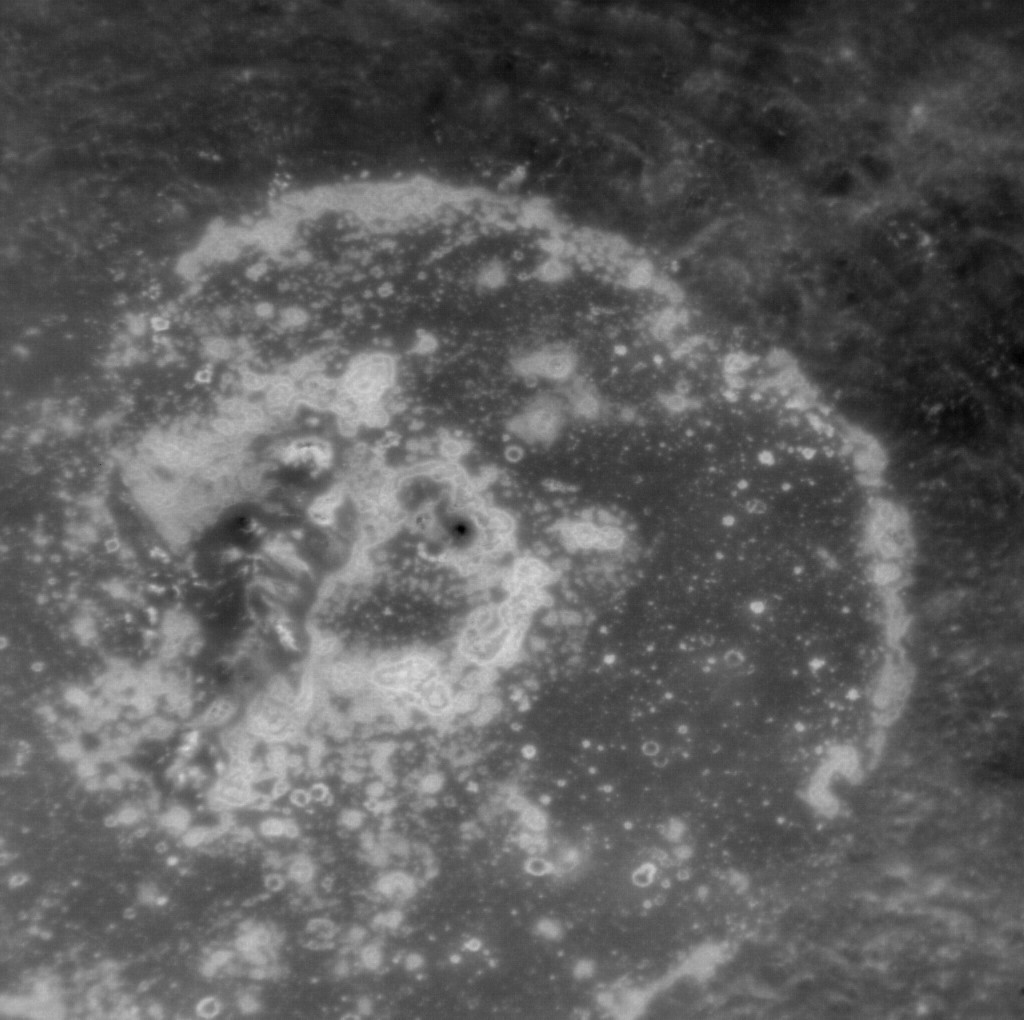
Abundant hollows on the floor of Warhol crater

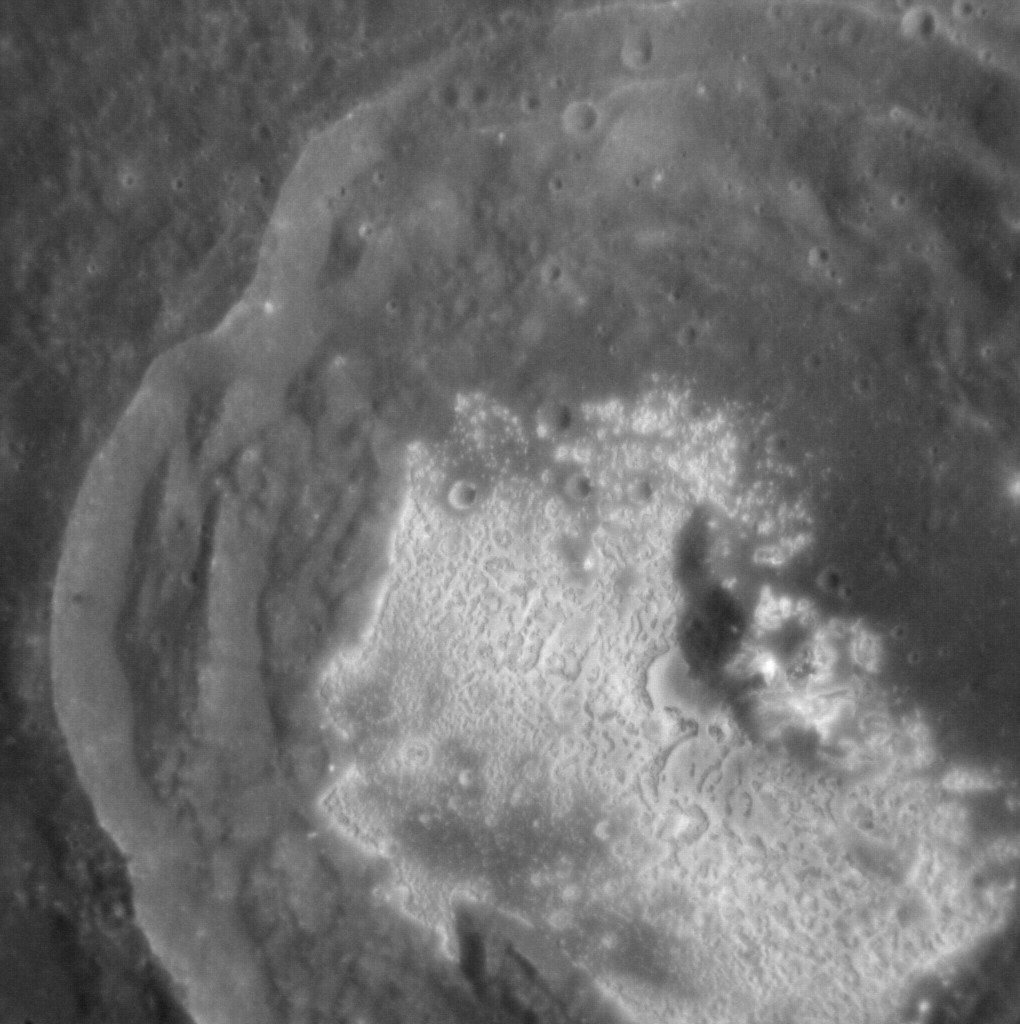
The hollows in the floor of Hopper are as bright as Kuiper crater

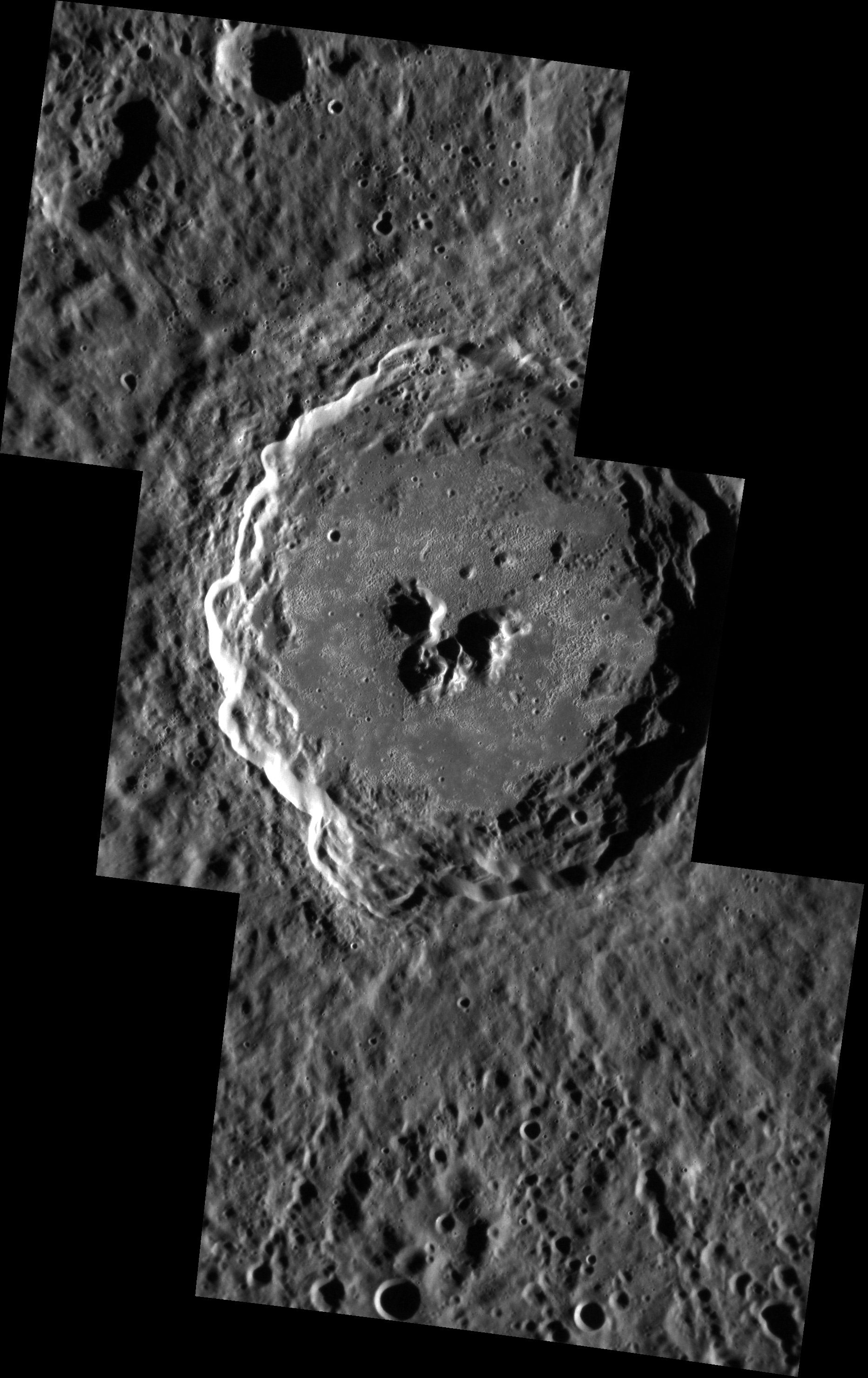
The floor of De Graft is covered with hollows

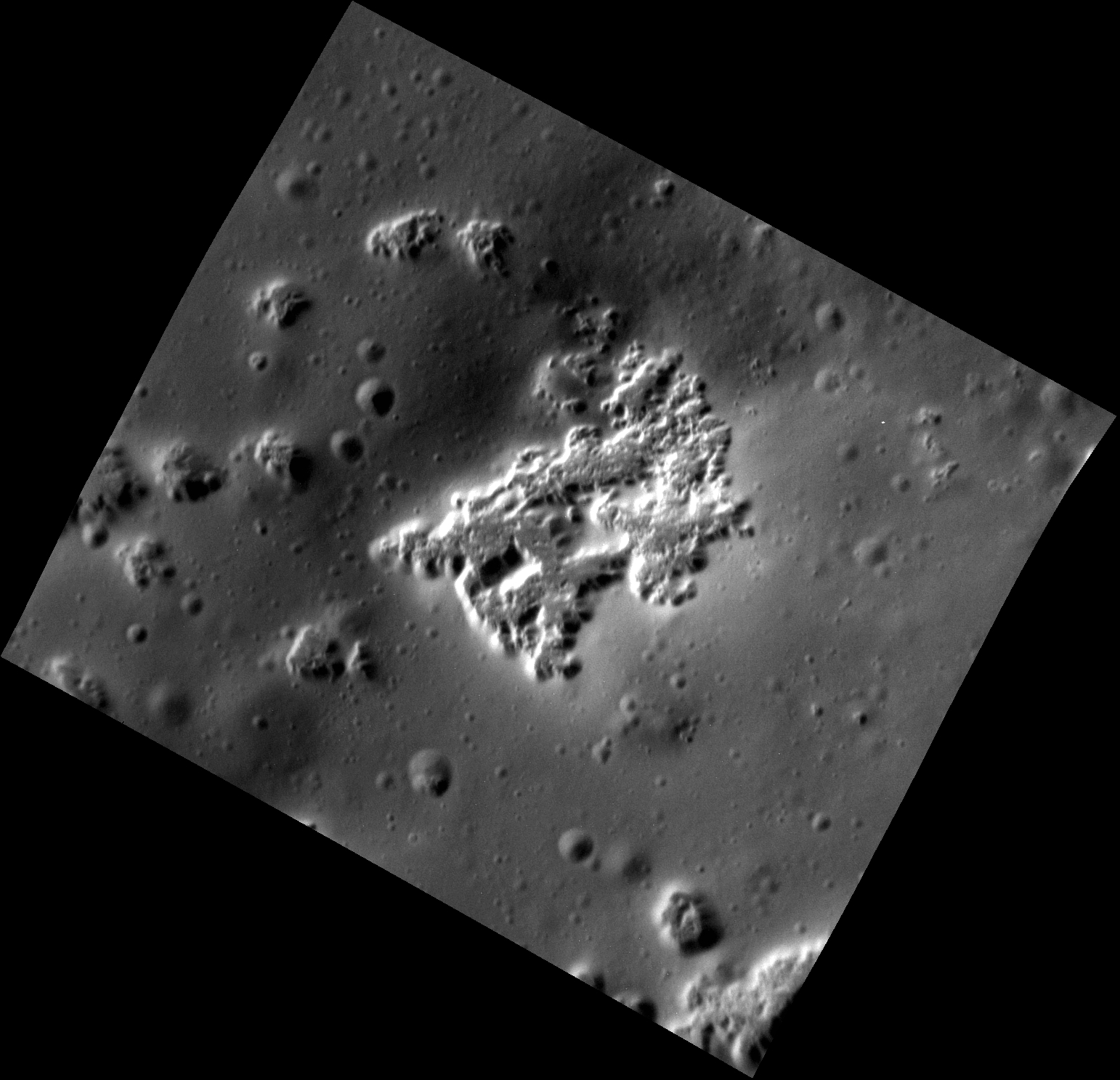
Detail of hollows in Scarlatti crater.

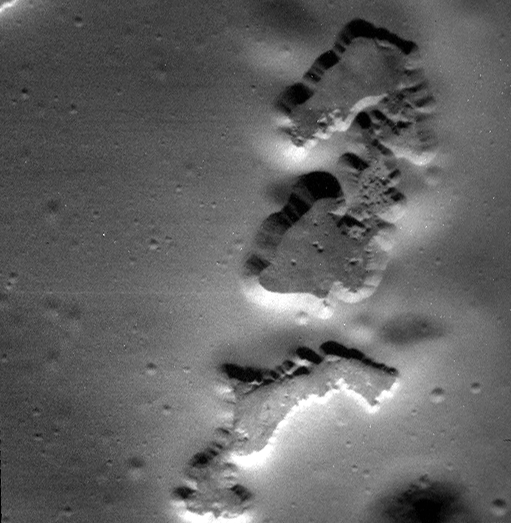
Very high-resolution image of hollows in Sholem Aleichem crater

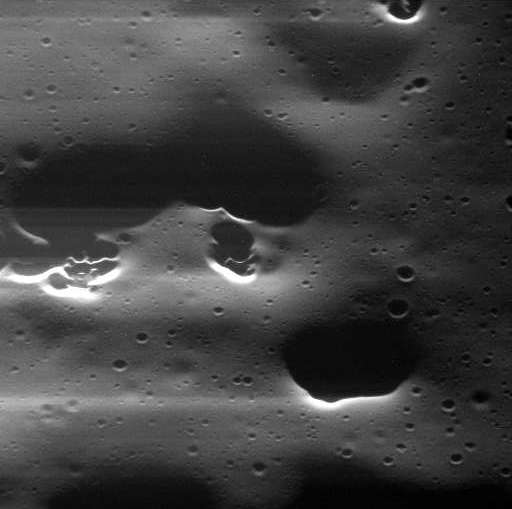
Mansur crater has hollows. Mansur has the type morphology of a Mansurian crater.

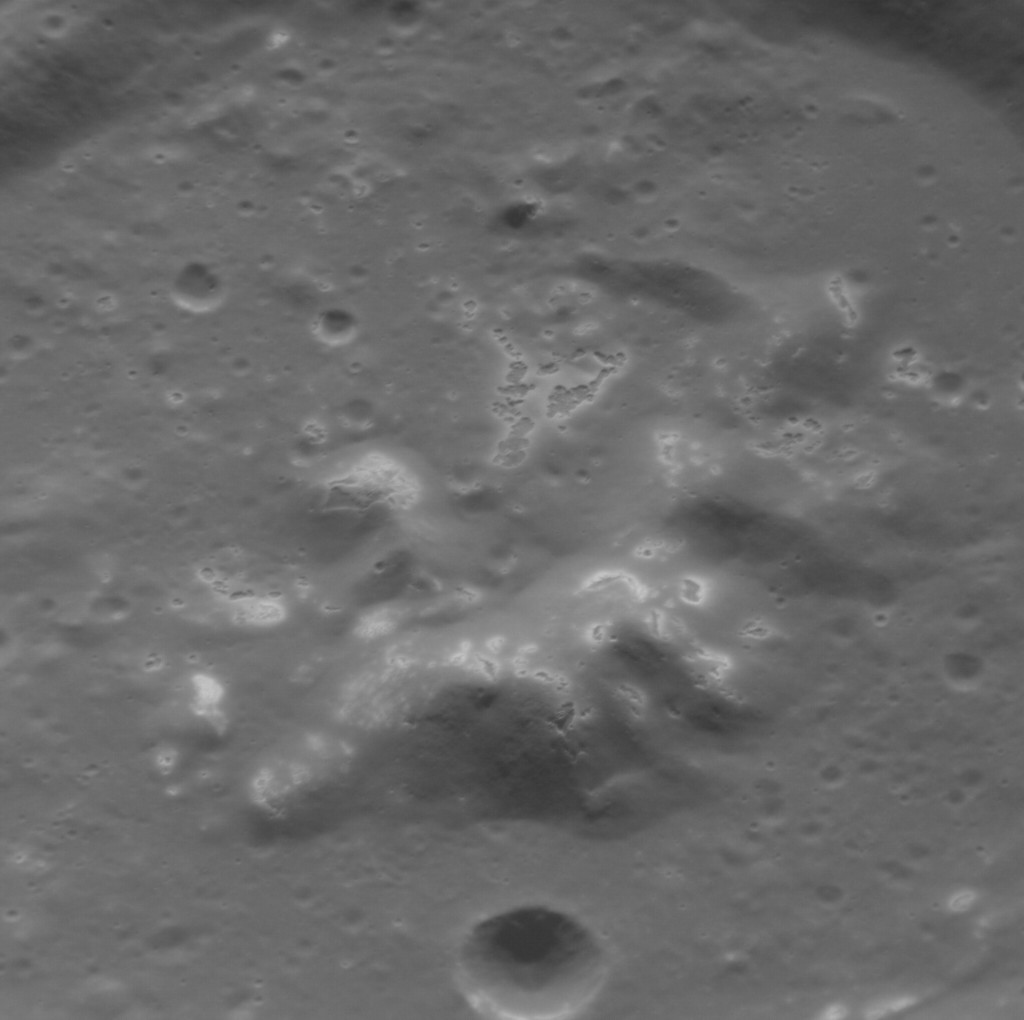
Hollows are present on and around the central peak complex of Pasch crater

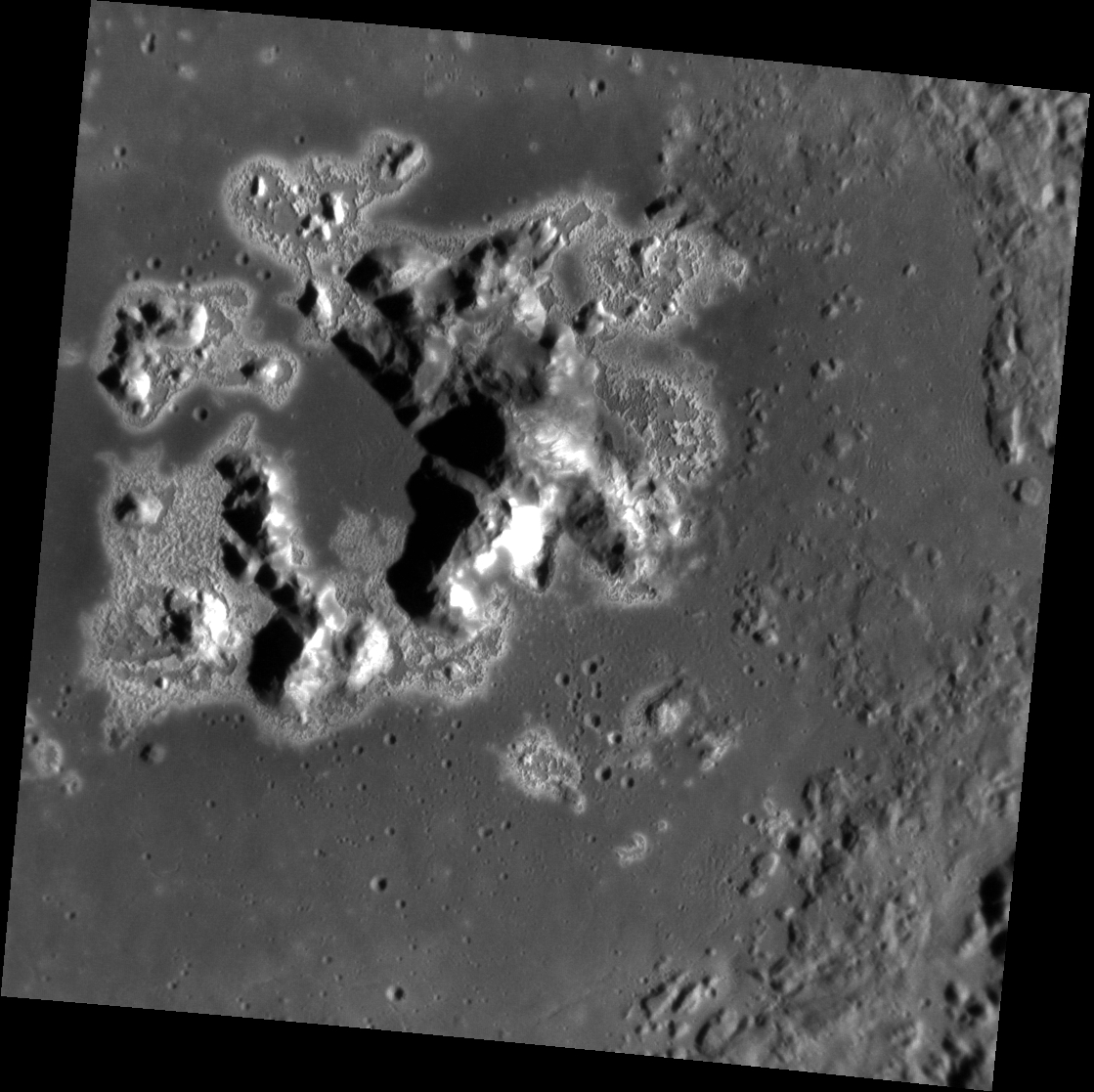
Hollows surround the central peak complex of Eminescu crater

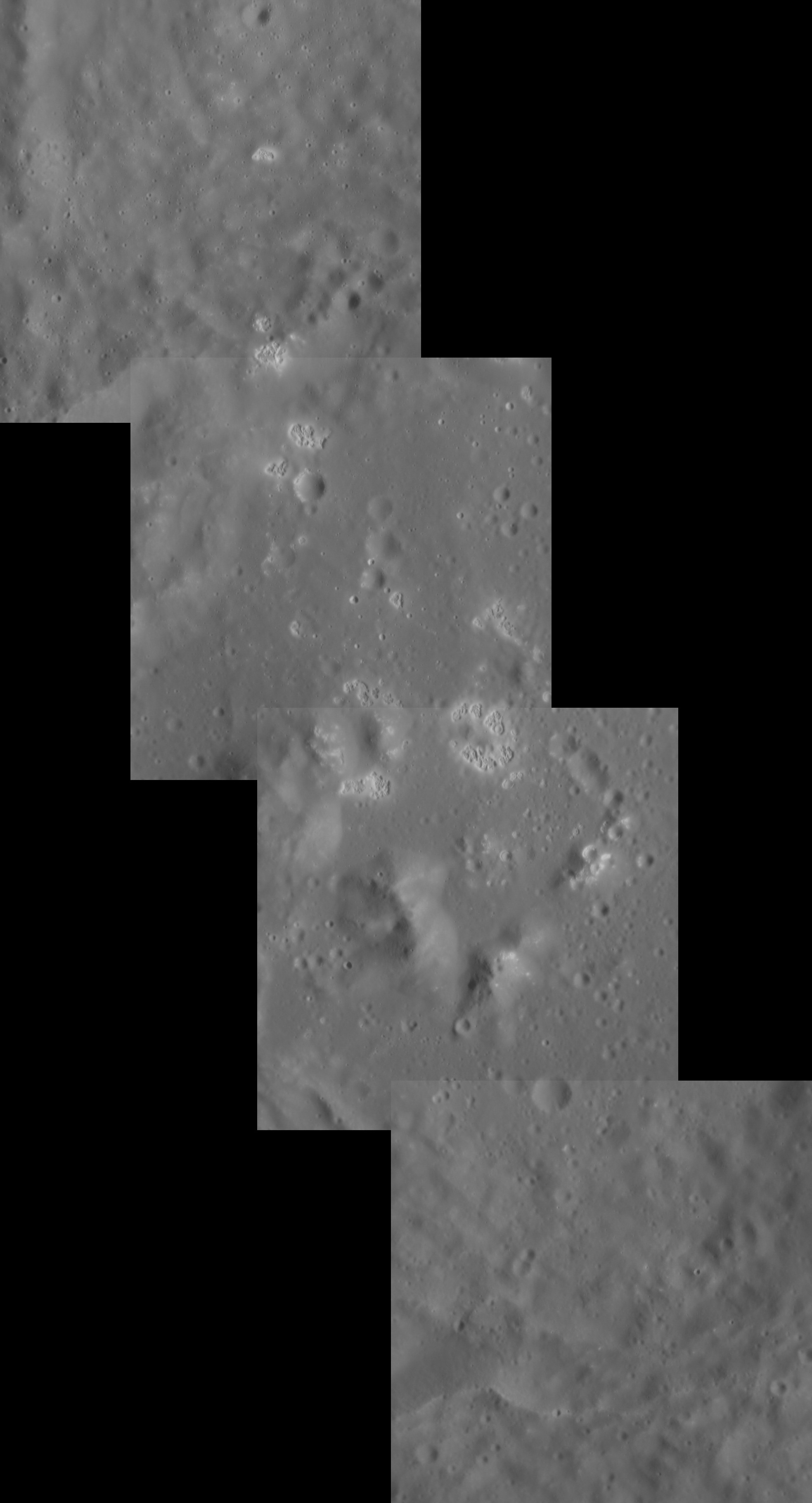
Hollows were imaged in detail in Truffaut crater
