= Pasch (crater) =

Crater on Mercury

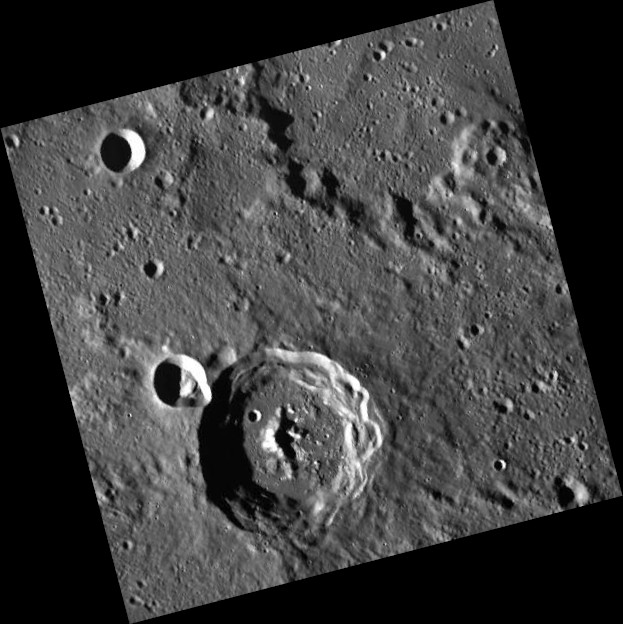
- MESSENGER WAC
- Planet: Mercury
- Coordinates: 46.12°N 225.25°W
- Quadrangle: Raditladi
- Diameter: 37.0 km (23.0 mi)
- Eponym: Ulrika Pasch

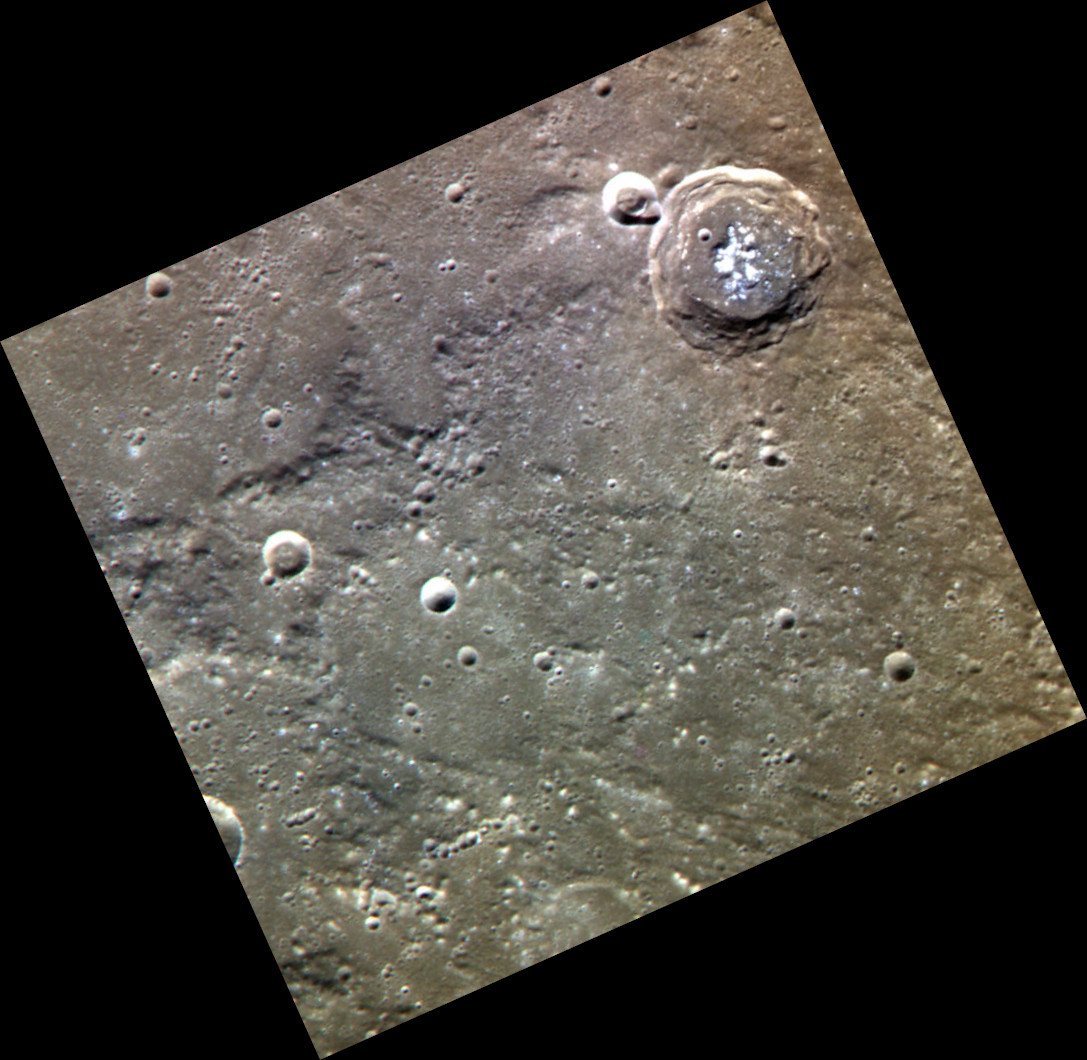
Exaggerated color image with Pasch in upper right

Pasch is a crater on Mercury, named by the International Astronomical Union (IAU) in 2012 after Swedish painter Ulrika Pasch.

== Location ==
Pasch is located northwest of the Caloris basin and north of the plains of Mearcair Planitia.

== Hollows ==
Hollows are present on the central peak complex, floor, and walls of Pasch crater.

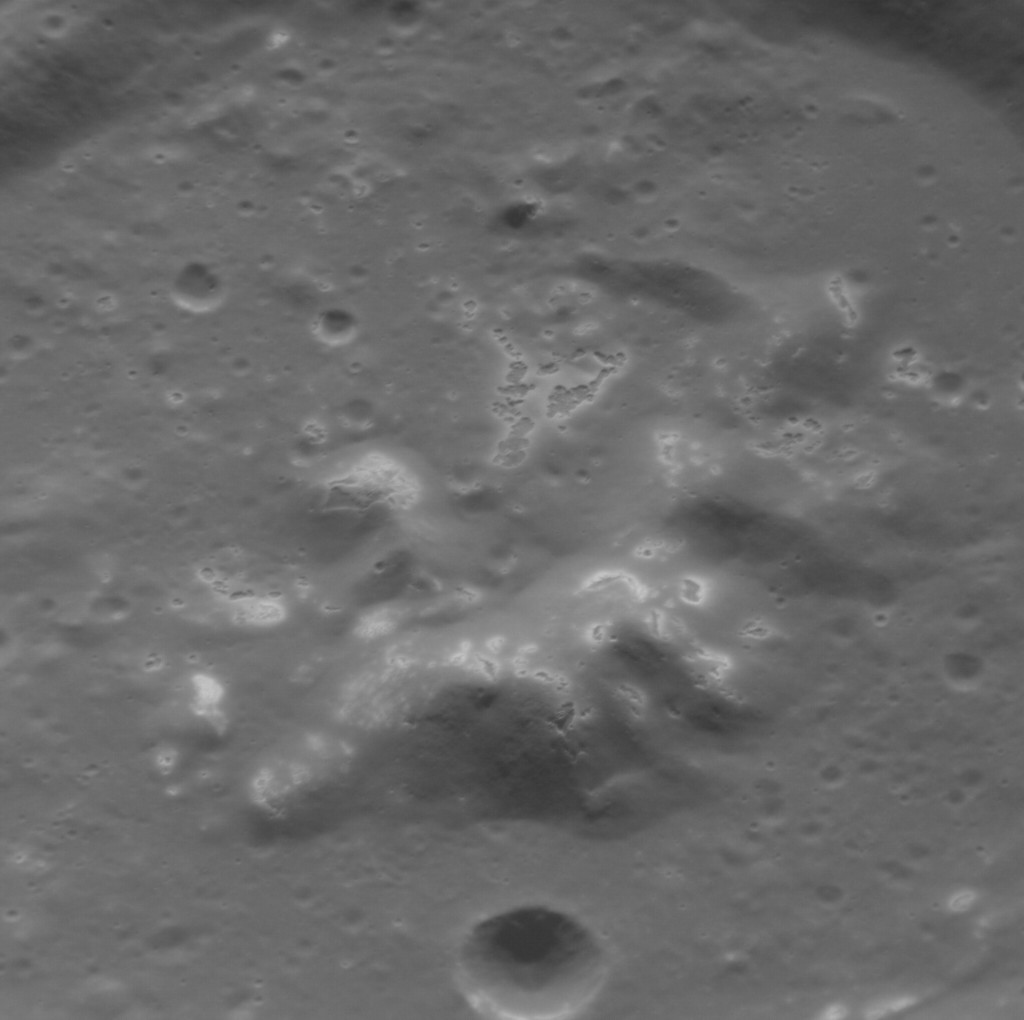
View of central peak complex looking southeast

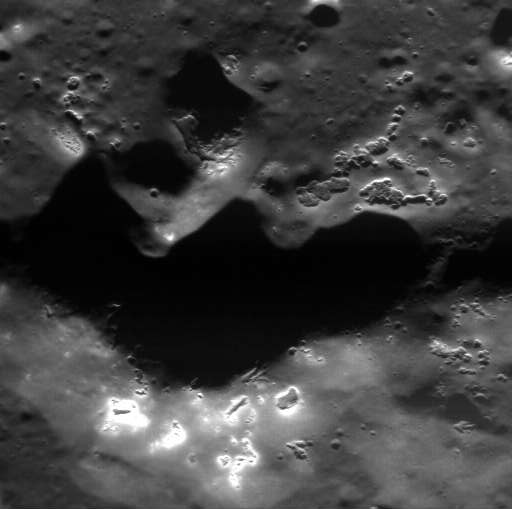
Similar view looking east
