= Holbein (crater) =

Crater on Mercury

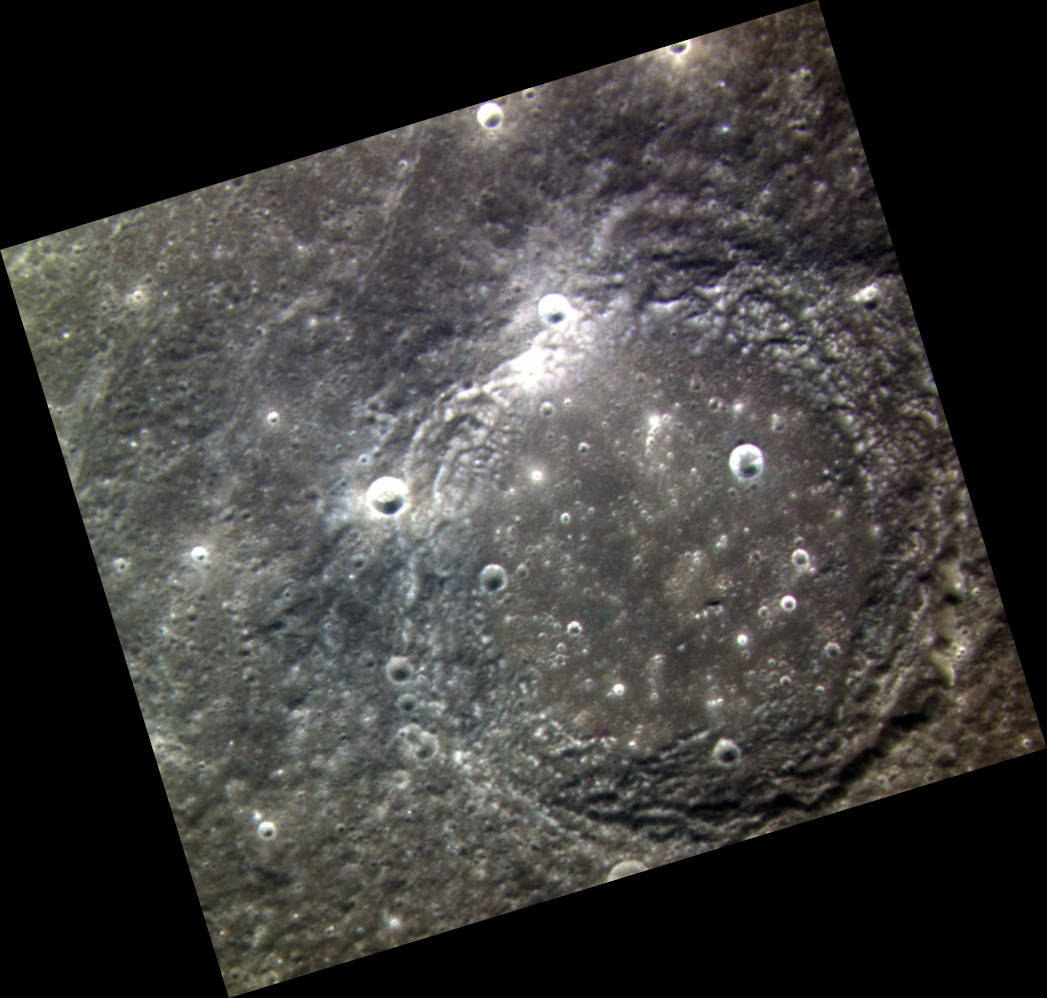
- Exaggerated color image of Holbein by MESSENGER
- Feature type: Impact crater
- Location: Victoria quadrangle, Mercury
- Coordinates: 36.16°N 29.84°W
- Diameter: 115 km (71 mi)
- Eponym: Hans Holbein the Elder and Hans Holbein the Younger

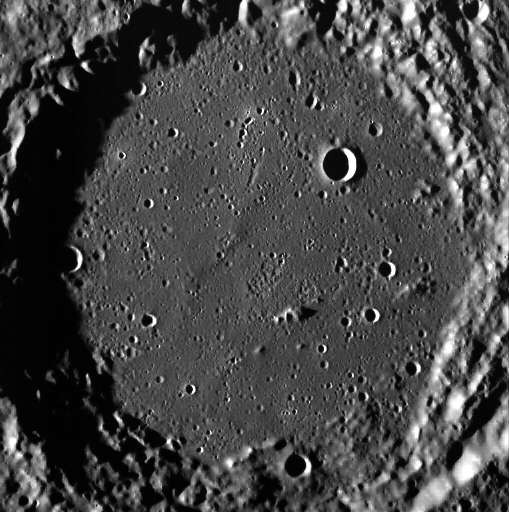
Interior of Holbein at low sun angle

Holbein is a crater on Mercury. Its name was adopted by the International Astronomical Union (IAU) in 1979. Holbein is named for the Germain painters Hans Holbein the Elder, who lived from 1465 to 1524, and Hans Holbein the Younger, who lived from 1497 to 1543. The crater was first imaged b Mariner 10 in 1974.

Holbein is just east of Endeavour Rupes. To the west of both are the craters Sōseki and Plath. To the east is Gluck crater. To the south are Driscoll and Geddes craters, and the Antoniadi Dorsum.
