= Echegaray (crater) =

Crater on Mercury

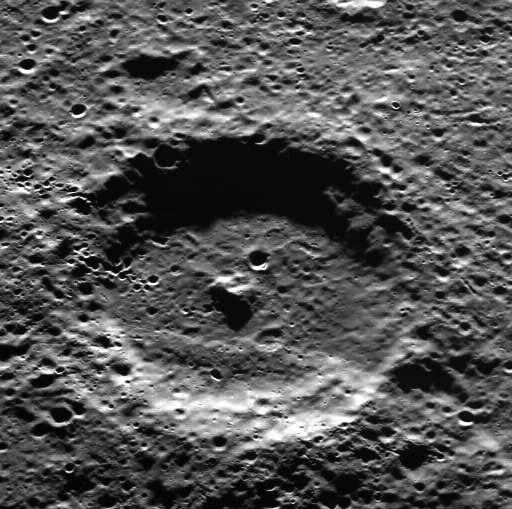
- MESSENGER WAC image of Echegaray
- Feature type: Central-peak impact crater
- Location: Victoria quadrangle, Mercury
- Coordinates: 43.48°N 20.22°W
- Diameter: 63 km (39 mi)
- Eponym: José Echegaray

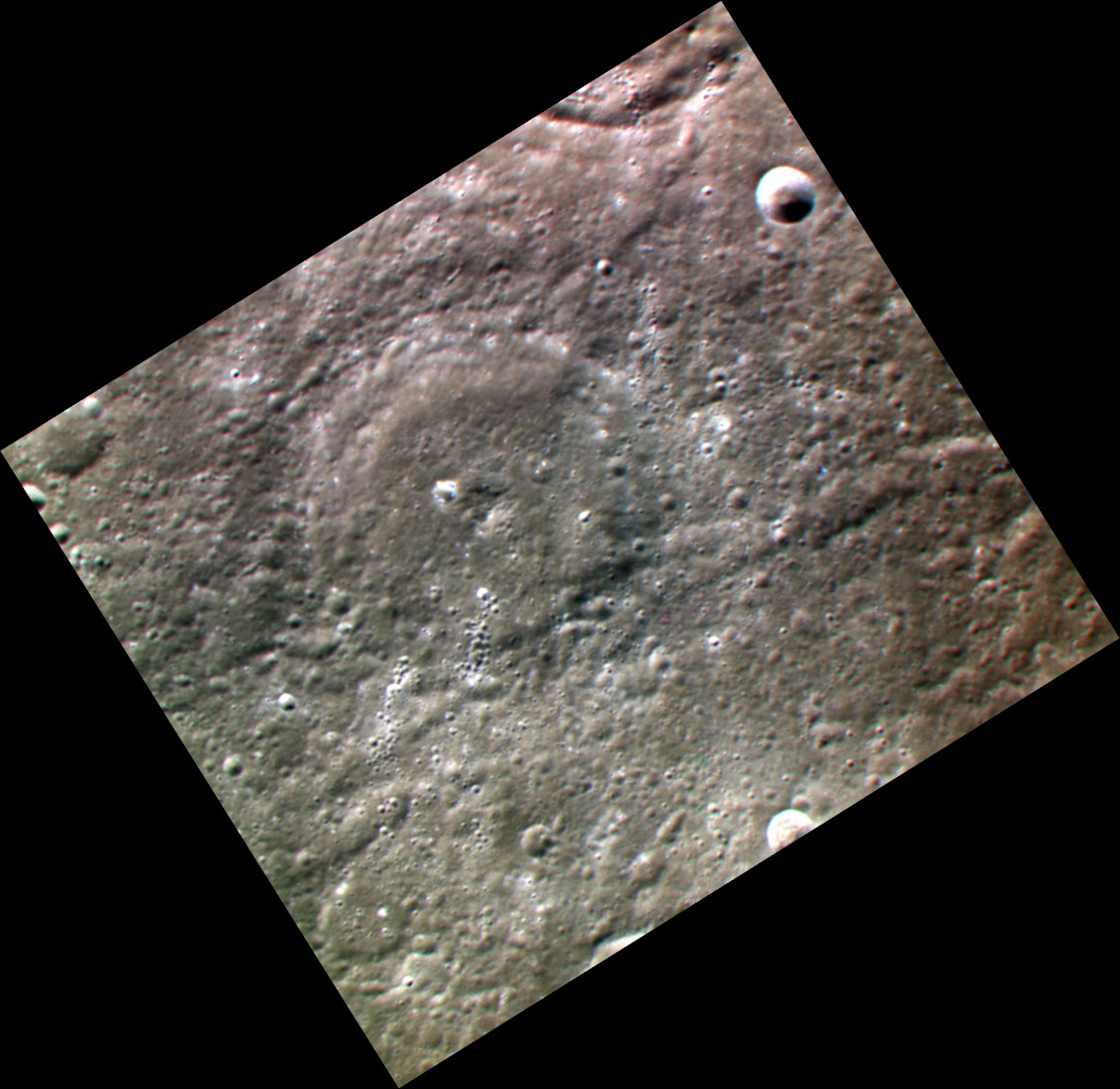
Exaggerated color image

Echegaray is a crater on Mercury. Its name was adopted by the International Astronomical Union (IAU) in 1985. Echegaray is named for the Spanish dramatist José Echegaray. The crater was first imaged by Mariner 10 in 1974.

To the south of Echegaray is Gluck crater. To the east is Monet, and to the northwest is Sor Juana.
