= Grieg (crater) =

Crater on Mercury

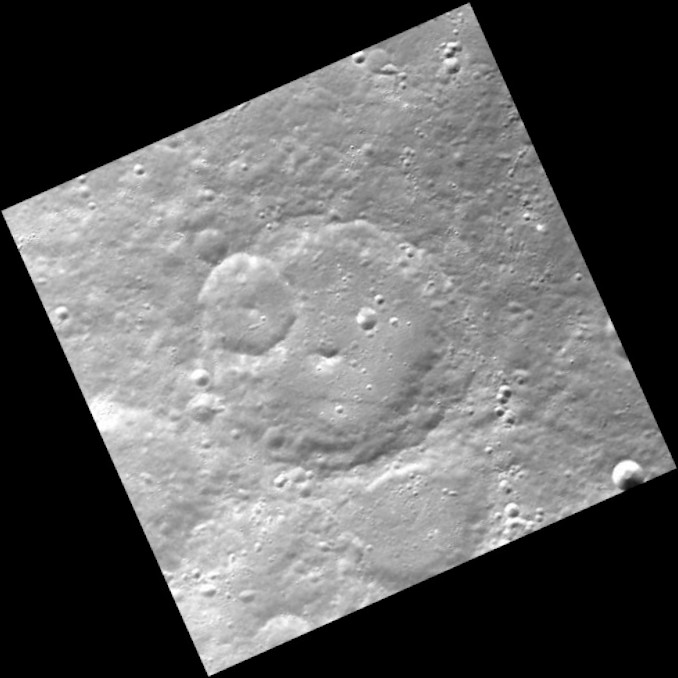
- MESSENGER WAC image of Grieg
- Feature type: Impact crater
- Location: Victoria quadrangle, Mercury
- Coordinates: 52.49°N 15.36°W
- Diameter: 59 km (37 mi)
- Eponym: Edvard Grieg

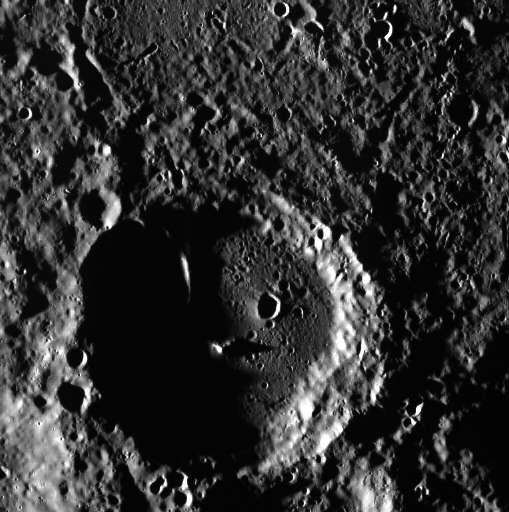
Grieg near the terminator

Grieg is a crater on Mercury. It has a diameter of 59 kilometers. Its name was adopted by the International Astronomical Union (IAU) in 1985. Grieg is named after the Norwegian composer Edvard Grieg, who lived from 1843 to 1907. The crater was first imaged by Mariner 10 in 1974.

Grieg lies within a part of the Borealis Planitia. To the west of it is Sor Juana crater, and to the southeast is Monet. To the north is Abedin.
