= Monet (crater) =

Crater on Mercury

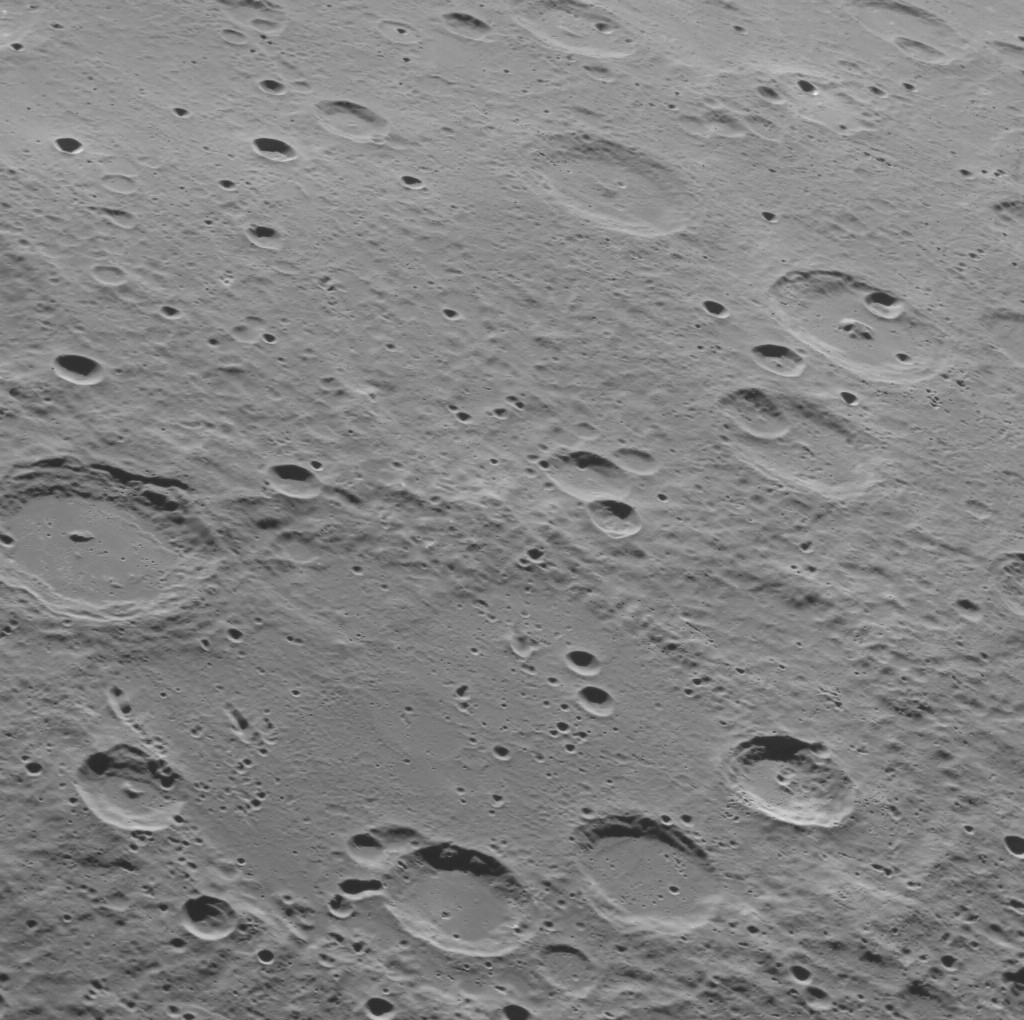
- MESSENGER WAC image of Monet
- Feature type: Impact crater
- Location: Victoria quadrangle, Mercury
- Coordinates: 44.23°N 9.77°W
- Diameter: 203 km (126 mi)
- Eponym: Claude Monet

Monet is a crater on Mercury. Its name was adopted by the International Astronomical Union (IAU) in 1979. Monet is named for the French artist Claude Monet, who lived from 1840 to 1926. The crater was first imaged by Mariner 10 in 1974.

To the west of Monet is Echegaray crater. To the northwest is Grieg, and to the southwest is Gluck. To the east is Sousa crater.

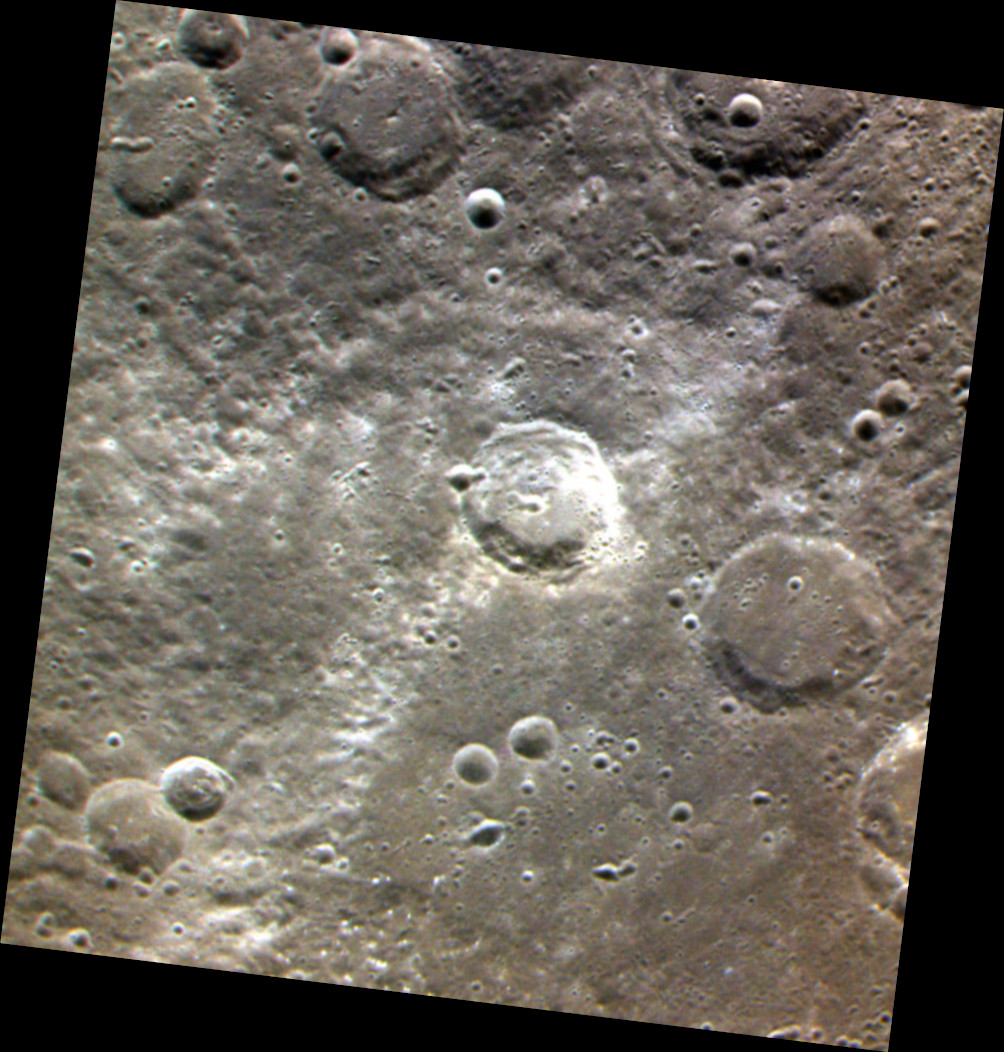
Exaggerated color image of northern Monet (lower right)

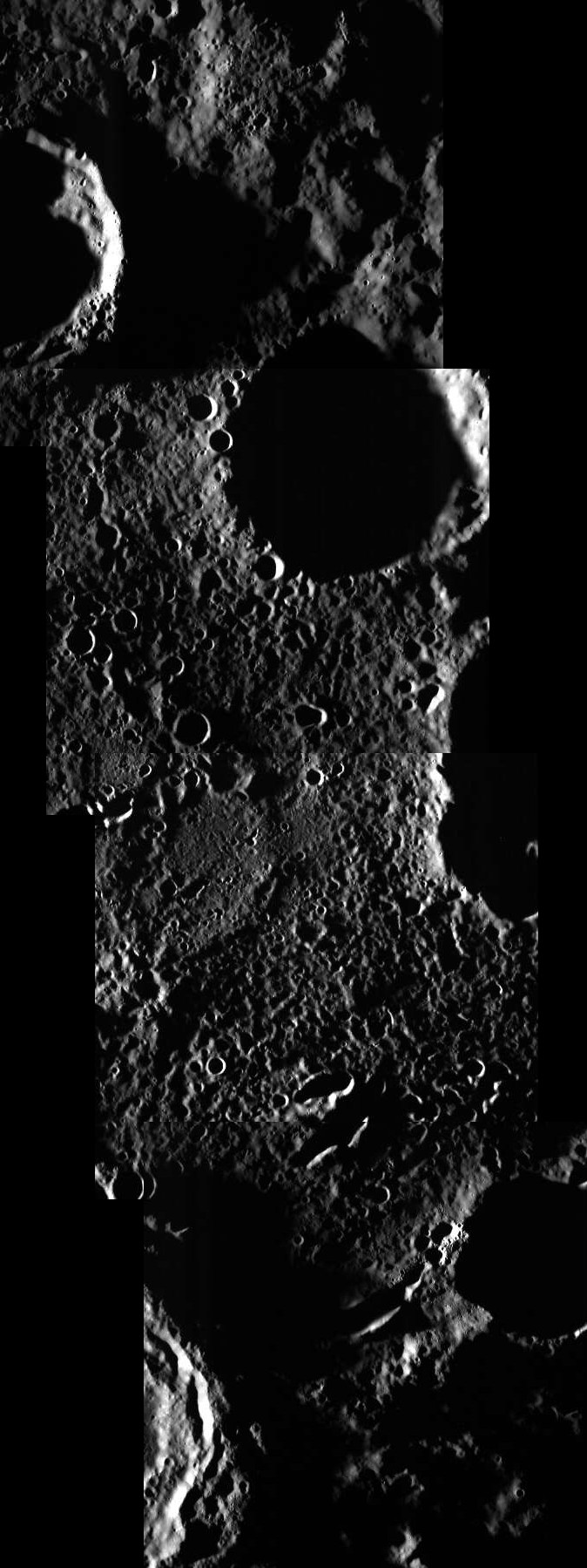
Eastern Monet crater near the terminator
