= Wren (crater) =

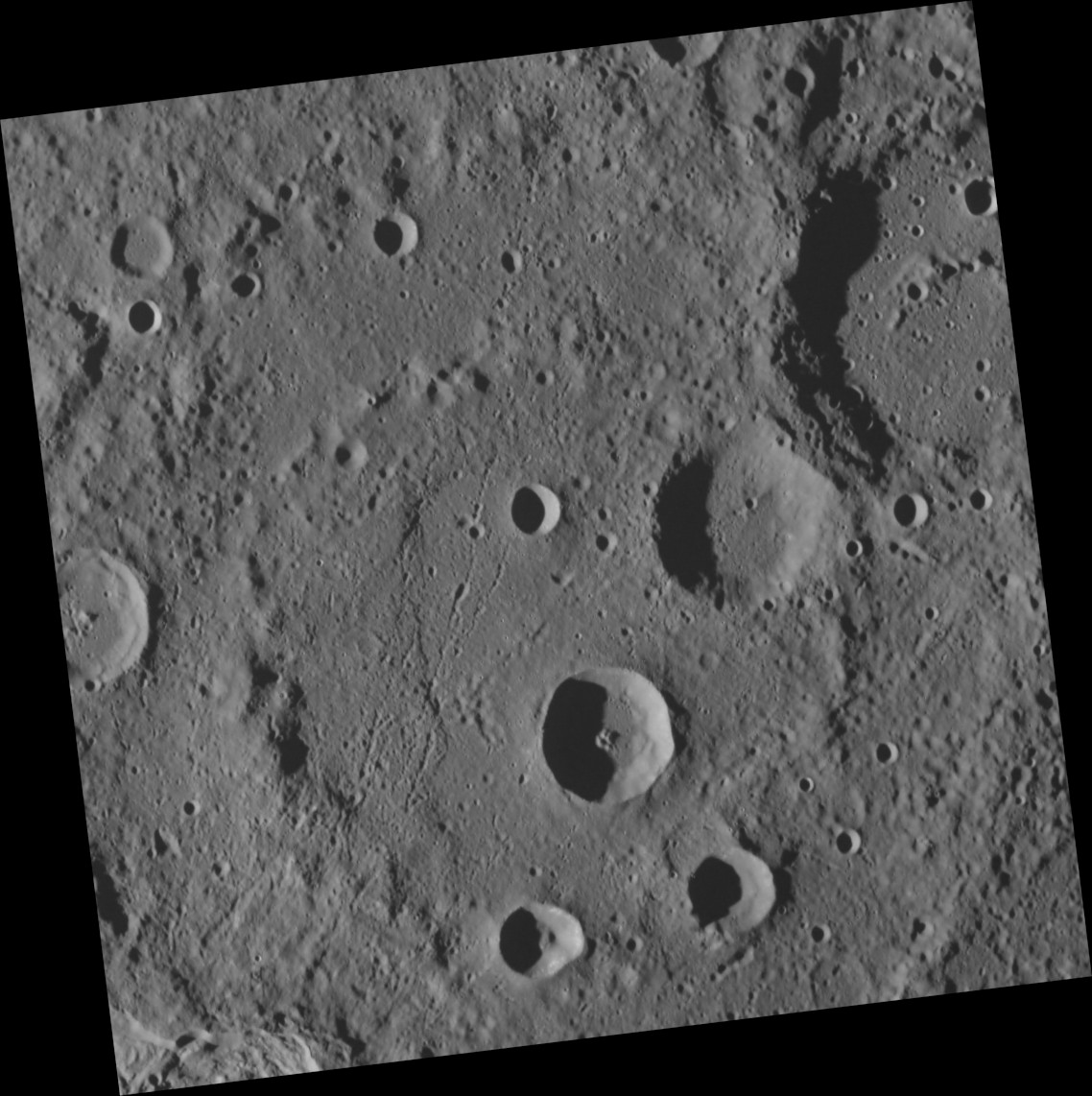
- MESSENGER WAC
- Planet: Mercury
- Coordinates: 24.84°N 35.95°W
- Quadrangle: Victoria
- Diameter: 204 km (127 mi)
- Eponym: Christopher Wren

Wren is a crater on Mercury. It has a diameter of 204 kilometres (127 miles). Its name was adopted by the International Astronomical Union (IAU) in 1979. Wren is named for English architect Christopher Wren. The crater was first imaged by Mariner 10 in 1974.

Wren is one of 110 peak ring basins on Mercury.

Geddes crater and Antoniadi Dorsum are to the east of Wren.

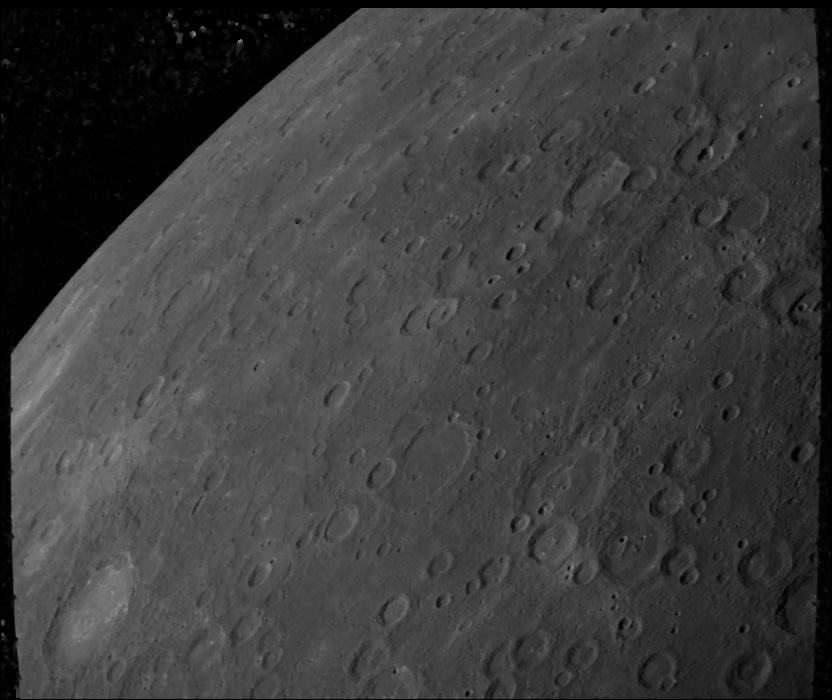
Mariner 10 image showing Wren above right of center

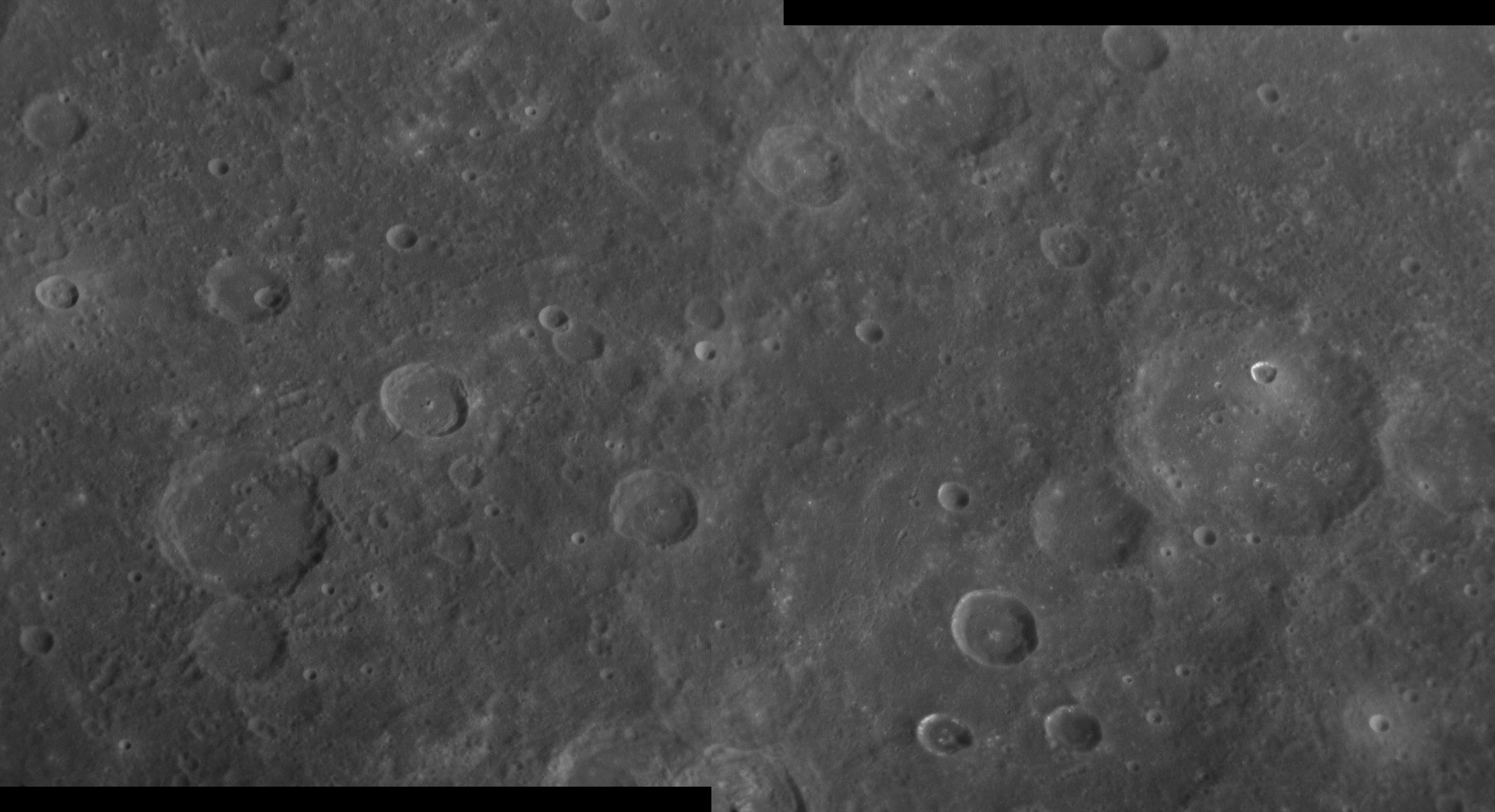
MESSENGER mosaic showing Wren at right, from the second flyby in October 2008
