= Gluck (crater) =

Crater on Mercury

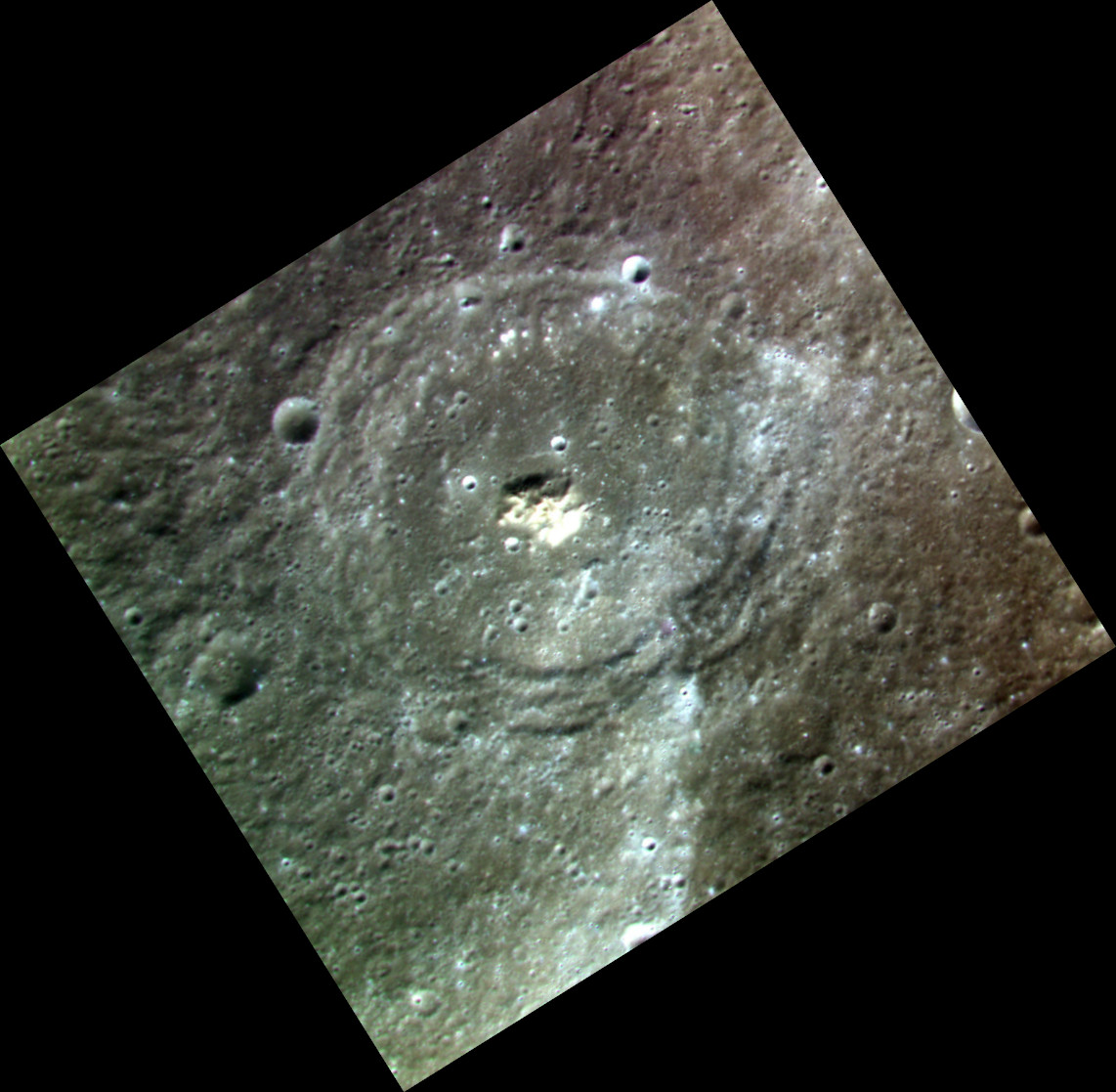
- Exaggerated color image from MESSENGER
- Feature type: Impact crater
- Location: Victoria quadrangle, Mercury
- Coordinates: 37.95°N 18.78°W
- Diameter: 100 km (62 mi)
- Eponym: Christoph Willibald Gluck

Sunrise on Gluck crater over 48 hrs. Acquired by MESSENGER on seven separate orbits in 2012.

Gluck is a crater on Mercury. It has a diameter of 100 kilometers. Its name was adopted by the International Astronomical Union (IAU) in 1979. Gluck is named for the Austrian composer Christoph Willibald Gluck, who lived from 1714 to 1787. The crater was first imaged by Mariner 10 in 1974.

To the north of Gluck is Echegaray crater. To the west is Holbein, and to the southeast is Vlaminck.
