= Vlaminck (crater) =

Crater on Mercury

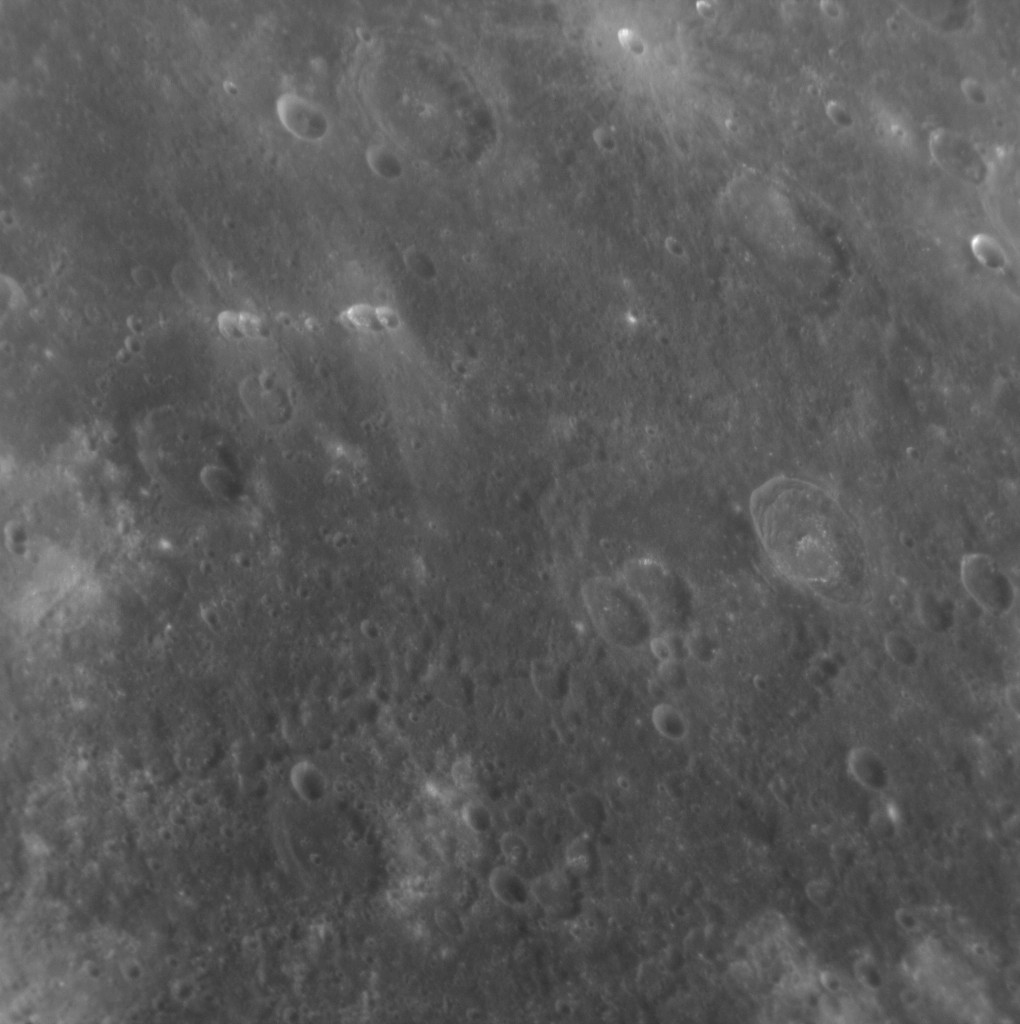
- MESSENGER NAC image from its second flyby in October 2008, with Vlaminck below right of center
- Planet: Mercury
- Coordinates: 28.48°N 13.51°W
- Quadrangle: Victoria
- Diameter: 82 km (51 mi)
- Eponym: Maurice de Vlaminck

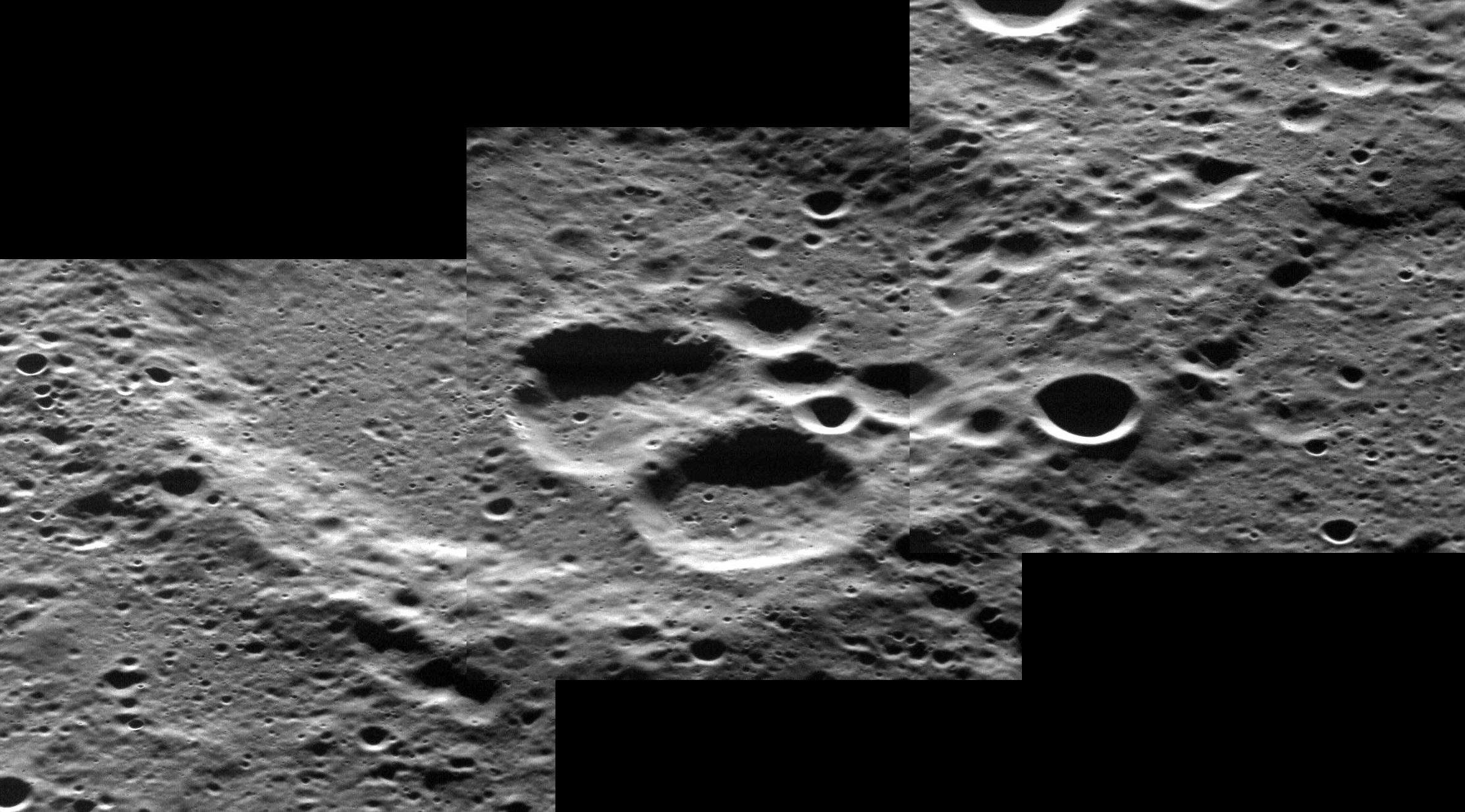
Oblique view of most of the crater

Vlaminck is a crater on Mercury. It has a diameter of 82 kilometres (51 miles). Its name was adopted by the International Astronomical Union (IAU) in 1985. Vlaminck is named for the French painter Maurice de Vlaminck. The crater was first imaged by Mariner 10 in 1974.
