= Antoniadi Dorsum =

Wrinkle ridge on Mercury

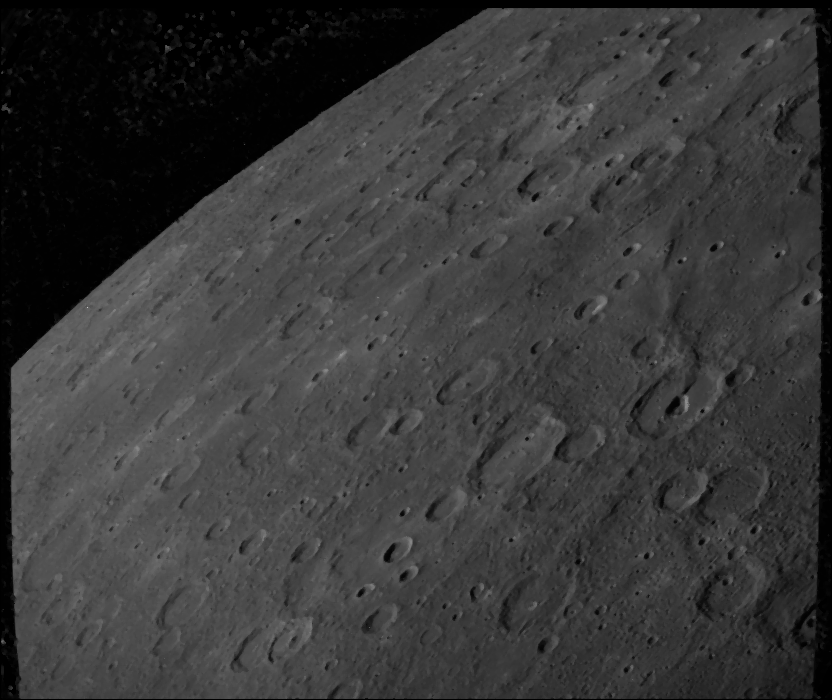
- Antoniadi Dorsum can be seen to the right of this Mariner 10 observation.
- Feature type: Dorsum
- Coordinates: 25.1°N 30.5°W
- Eponym: Eugène Michel Antoniadi

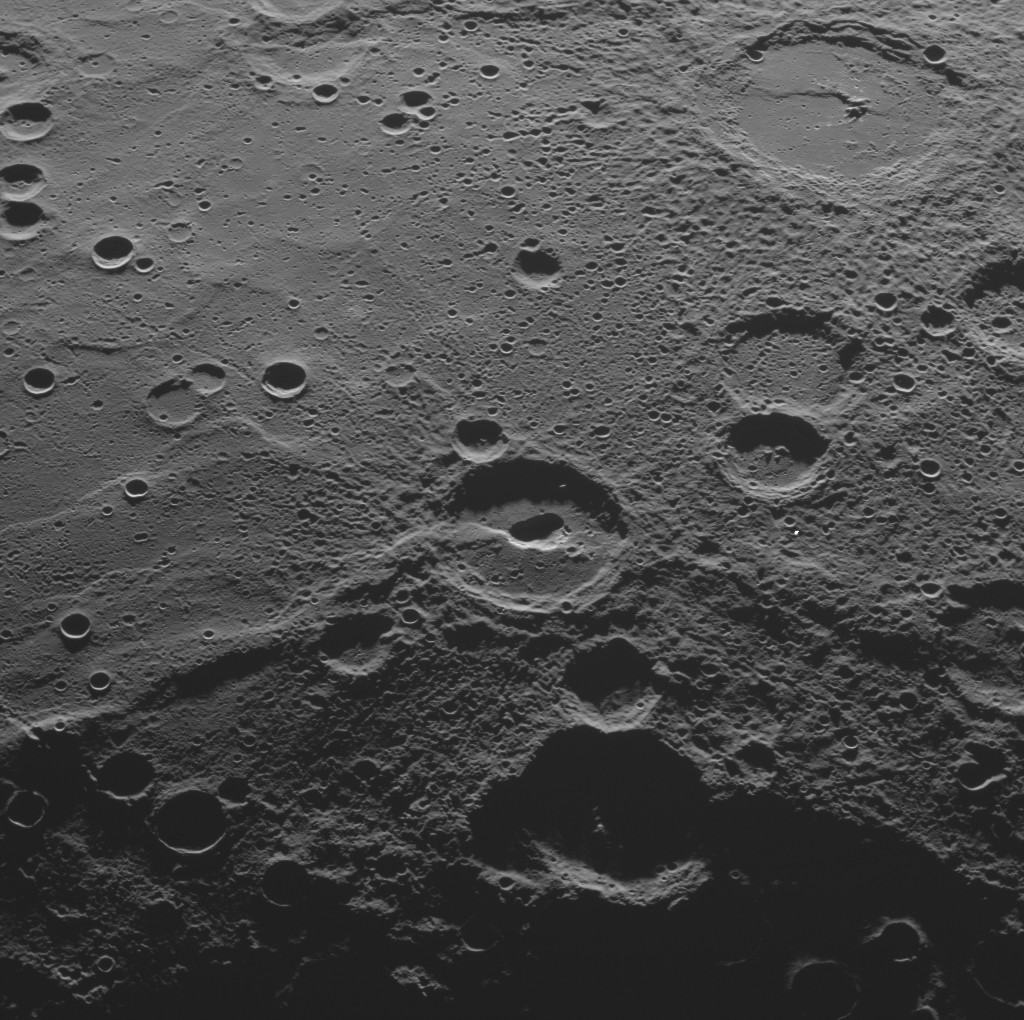
MESSENGER image showing Antoniadi Dorsum cutting across Geddes crater

Antoniadi Dorsum is a wrinkle ridge on Mercury at 25.1°N 30.5°W, approximately 359 km in length. In 1976, it was named by the International Astronomical Union after Eugène Michel Antoniadi. It is mainly north–south trending and cuts across the crater Geddes. The same trend of ridges continues to the north, where it is called Endeavour Rupes near the crater Holbein, and beyond that, it is called Victoria Rupes, which cuts across the crater Enheduanna.
