= Sōseki (crater) =

Crater on Mercury

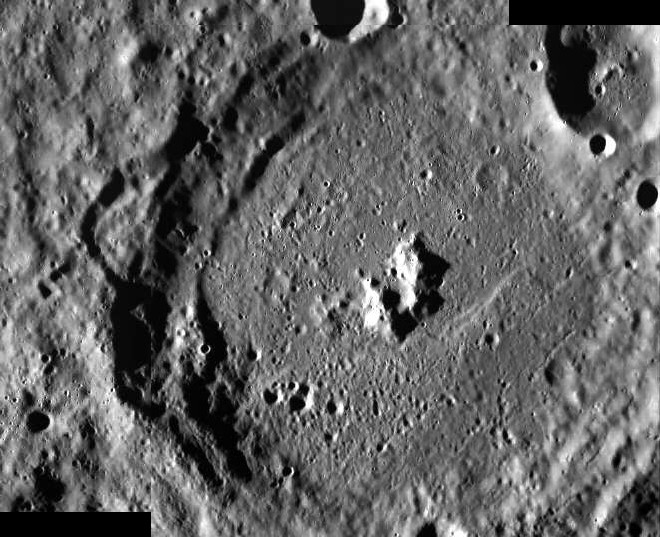
- MESSENGER WAC mosaic
- Planet: Mercury
- Coordinates: 39.31°N 38.77°W
- Quadrangle: Victoria
- Diameter: 92 km (57 mi)
- Eponym: Natsume Sōseki

Sōseki is a crater on Mercury. Its name was adopted by the International Astronomical Union (IAU) in 1985. The crater is named for Japanese novelist Natsume Sōseki. The crater was first imaged by Mariner 10 in 1974.

The crater Plath is south of Sōseki, and it contains hollows.

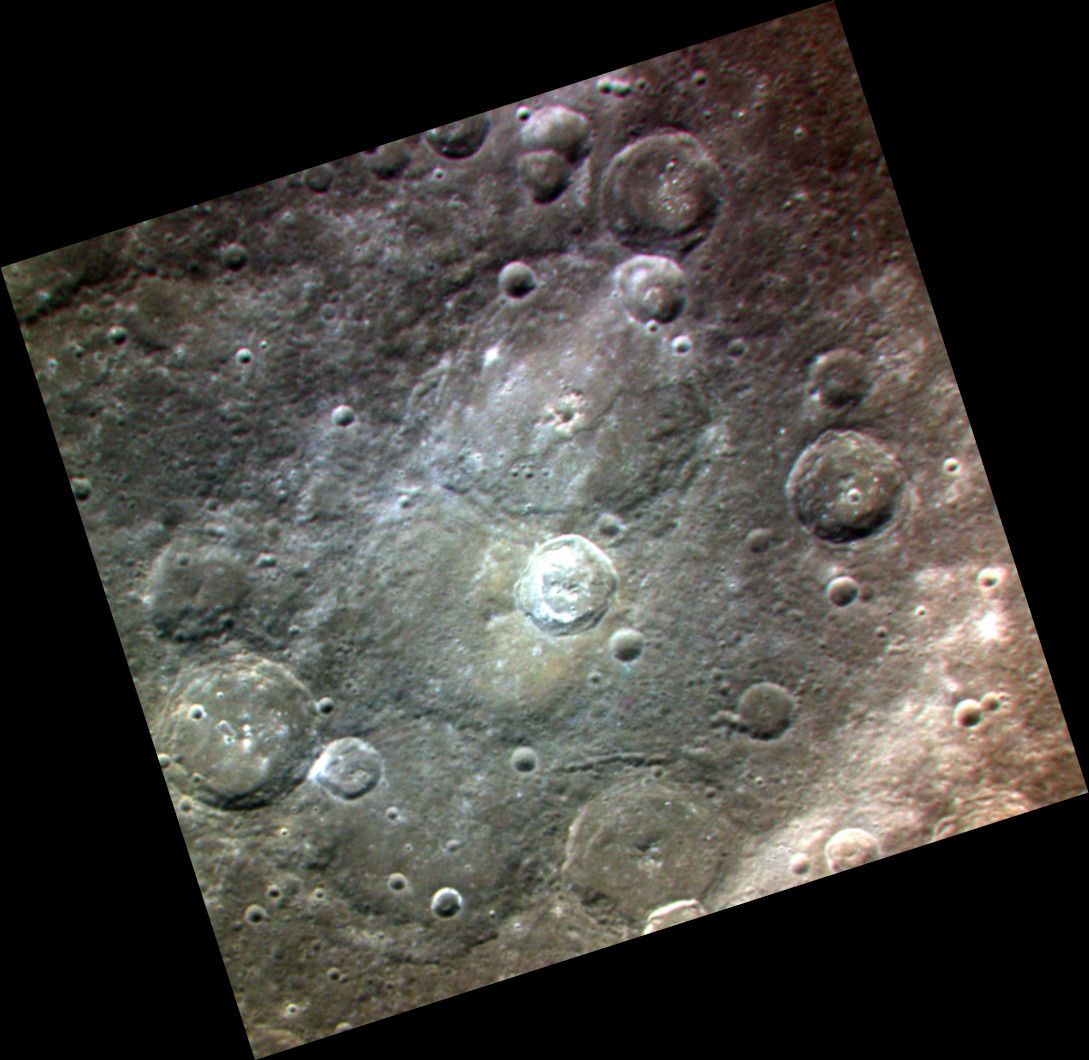
Exaggerated color image with Sōseki above center
