= Driscoll (crater) =

Crater on Mercury

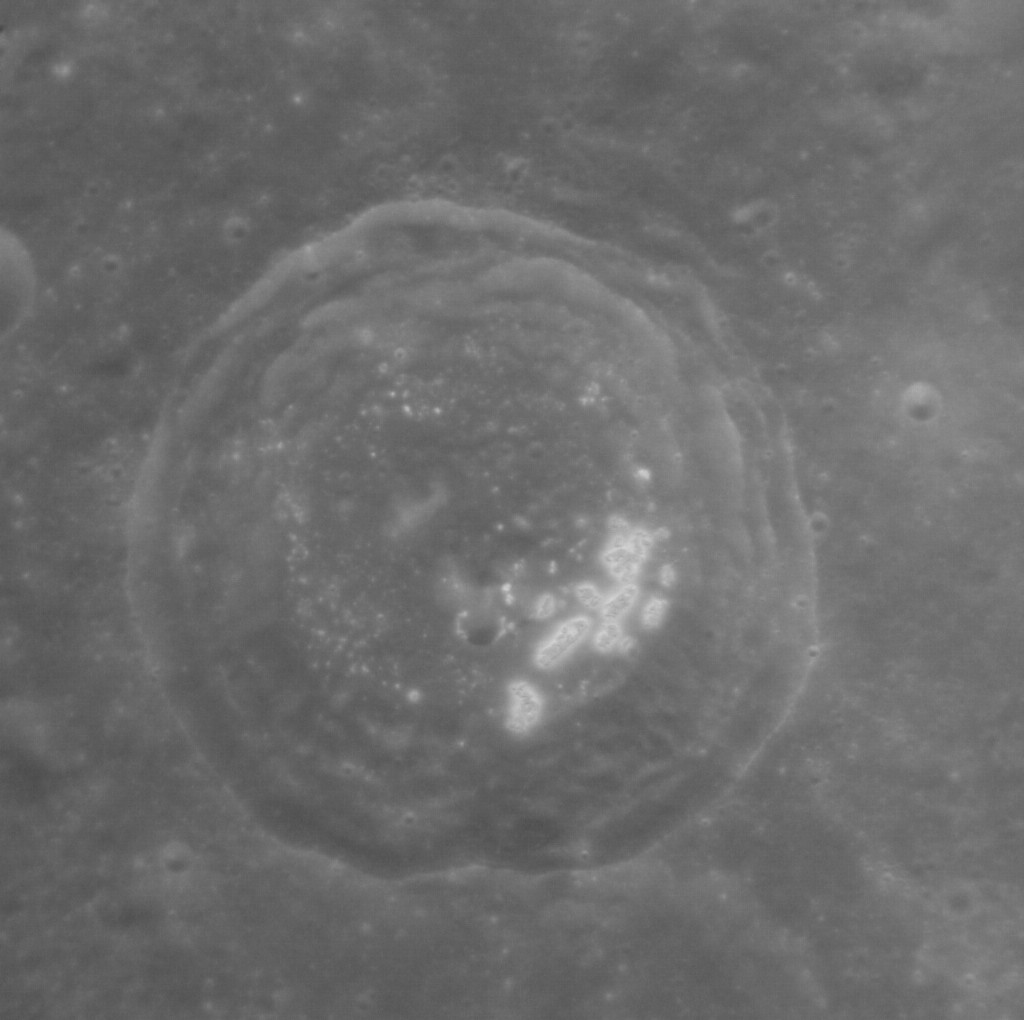
- MESSENGER NAC. Bright spots are hollows.
- Feature type: Central-peak impact crater
- Location: Victoria quadrangle, Mercury
- Coordinates: 30.58°N 33.58°W
- Diameter: 30 km (19 mi)
- Eponym: Clara Driscoll

Driscoll is a crater on Mercury. Its name was adopted by the International Astronomical Union (IAU) on September 25, 2015. Driscoll is named for the American stained glass artist Clara Driscoll.

Driscoll has hollows in its southeastern quadrant.

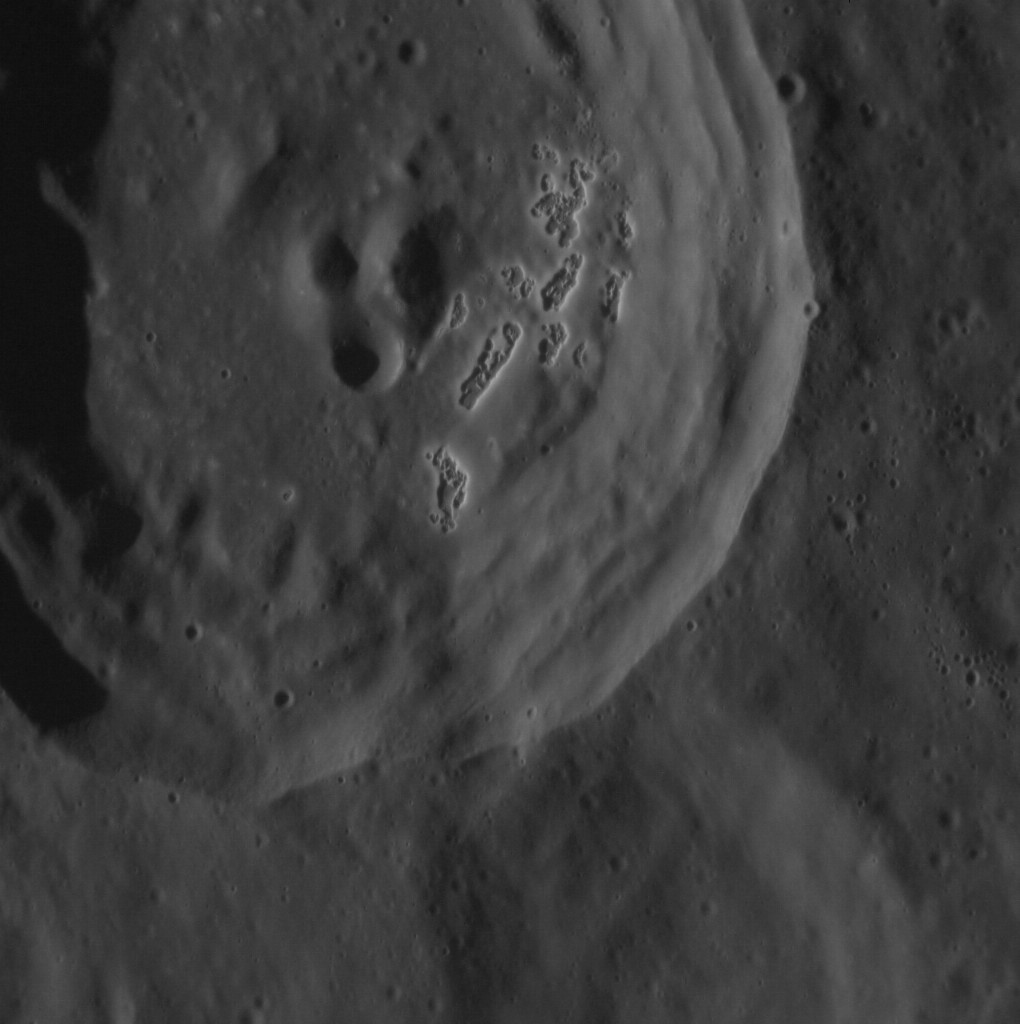
The hollows

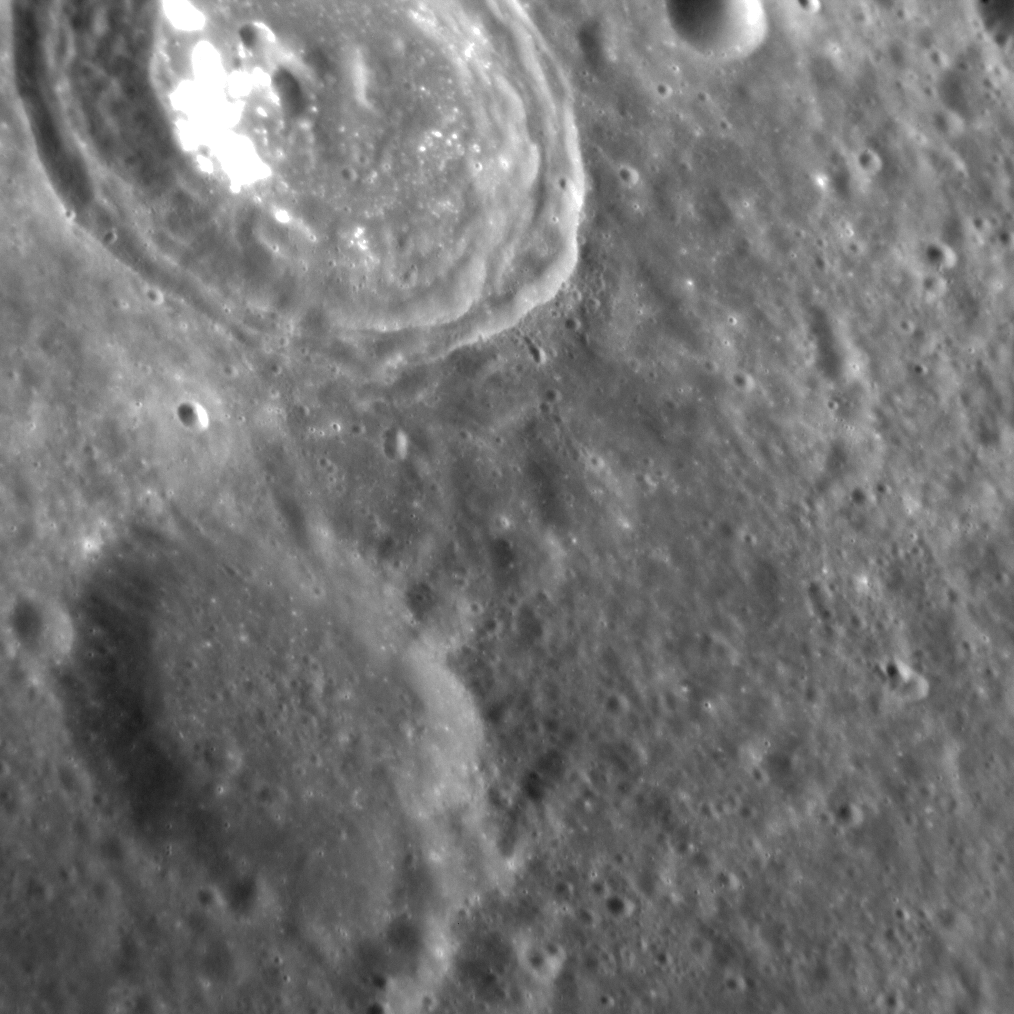
Oblique view
