= Victoria Rupes =

Rupes on Mercury

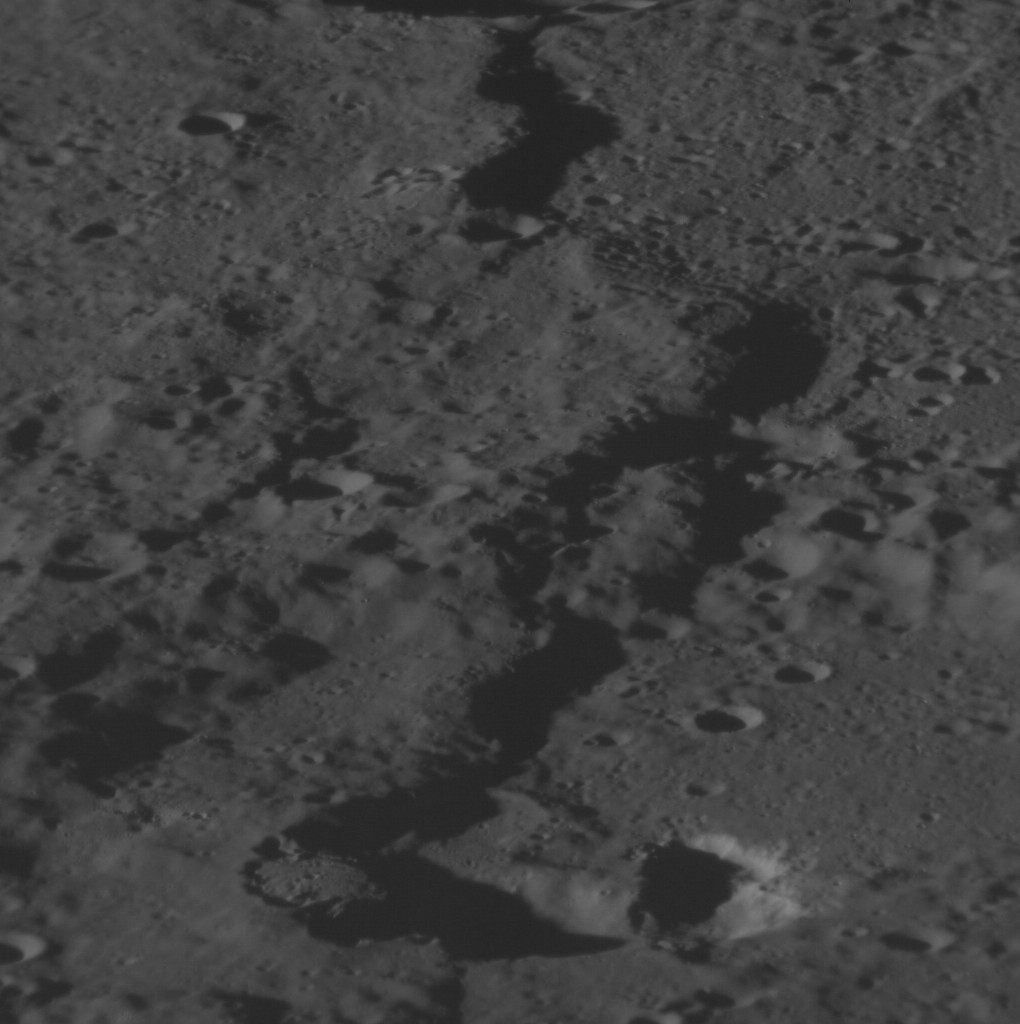
- Oblique MESSENGER NAC image
- Feature type: Rupes
- Coordinates: 50.9°N 31.1°W
- Eponym: Victoria, a ship used on Ferdinand Magellan's expedition

Victoria Rupes is an escarpment in the Victoria quadrangle of Mercury. The quadrangle was named after this escarpment, and the escarpment itself was named after the Victoria, a ship used on the famous expedition of Ferdinand Magellan. Its name was adopted by the International Astronomical Union (IAU) in 1976.

The escarpment cuts across Enheduanna crater at its southern end and across an unnamed crater near its center.

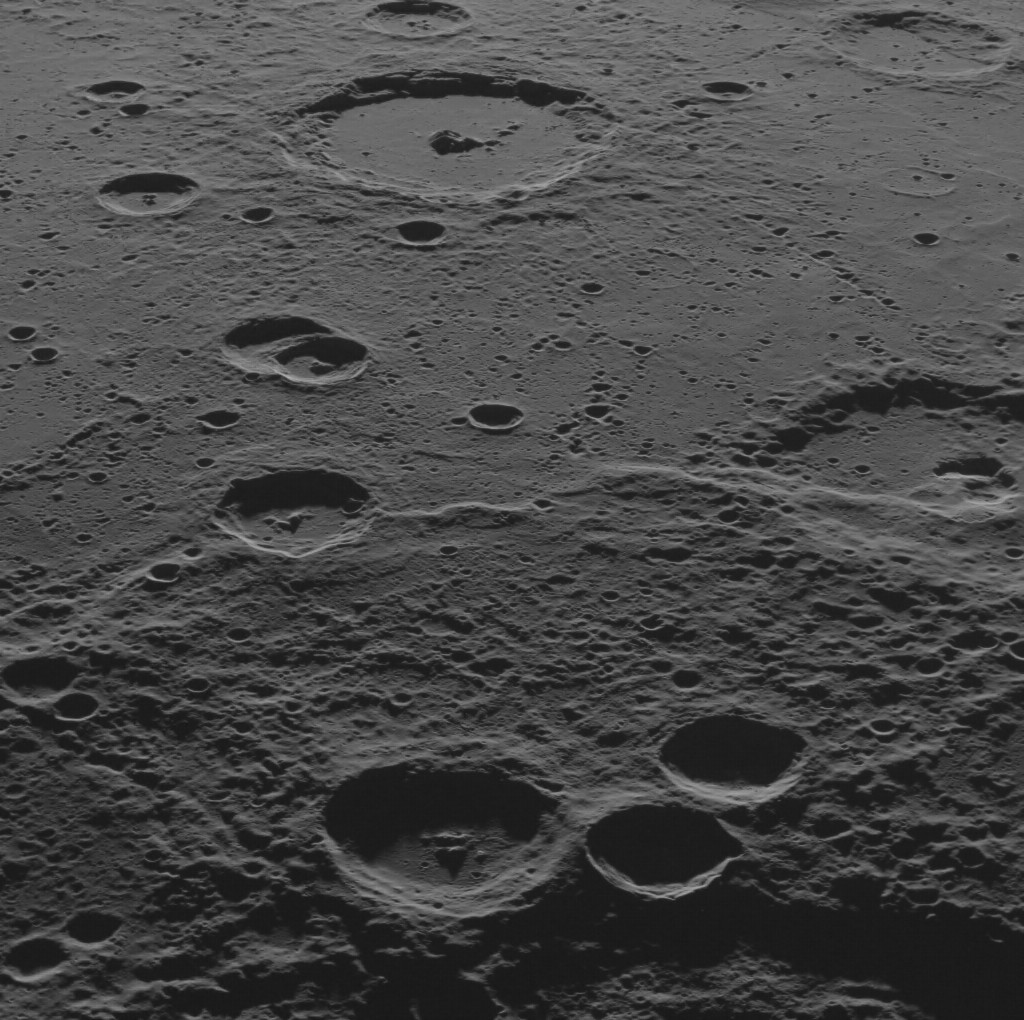
Victoria Rupes trends north-south across the center of this MESSENGER image. Sor Juana crater is in the background.

== See also ==
- List of escarpments
