= Larrocha (crater) =

Crater on Mercury

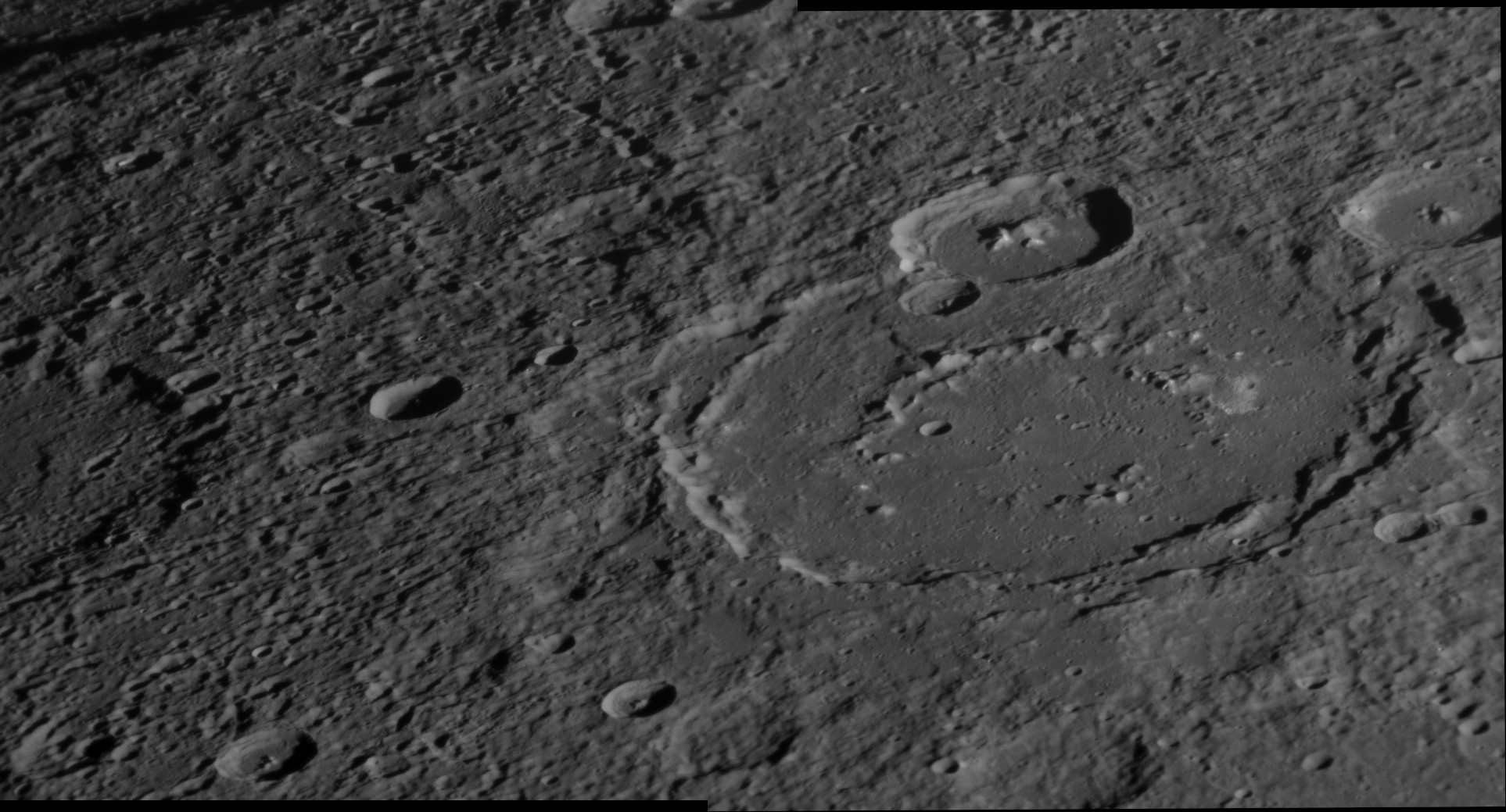
- Oblique view of Larrocha from MESSENGER's second flyby on 6 October 2008
- Feature type: Impact crater
- Location: Victoria quadrangle, Mercury
- Coordinates: 43.29°N 69.83°W.
- Diameter: 196 km (122 mi)
- Eponym: Alicia de Larrocha

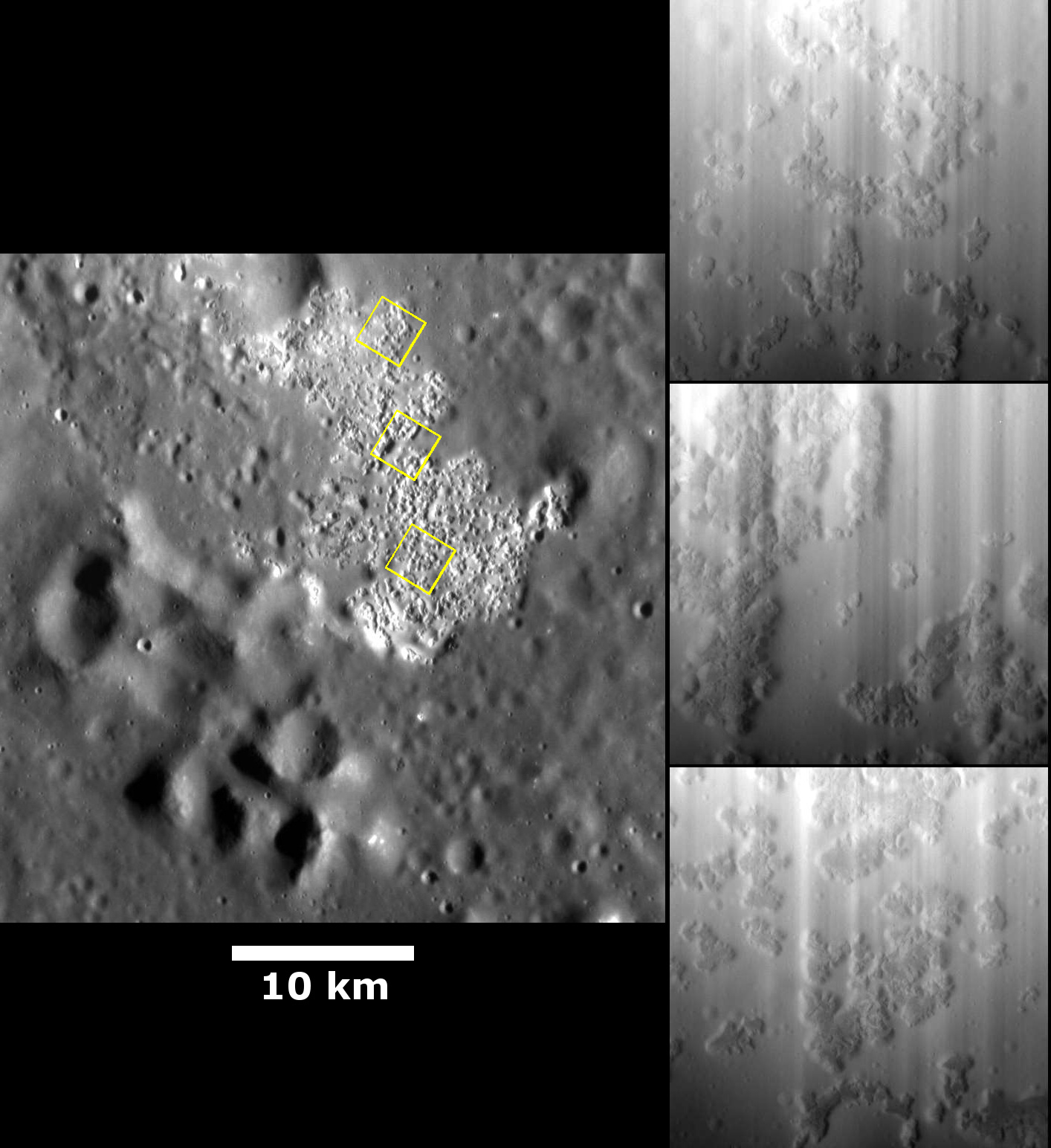
Hollows within Larrocha crater. The left image shows a patch of hollows on the east side of the crater, acquired by MESSENGER's Narrow Angle Camera (NAC) on 13 February 2013. The yellow squares show the locations of the three images to the right, acquired by the NAC on 17 February 2015 from a much lower altitude. The width of each of the three images on the right is about 1.72 km.

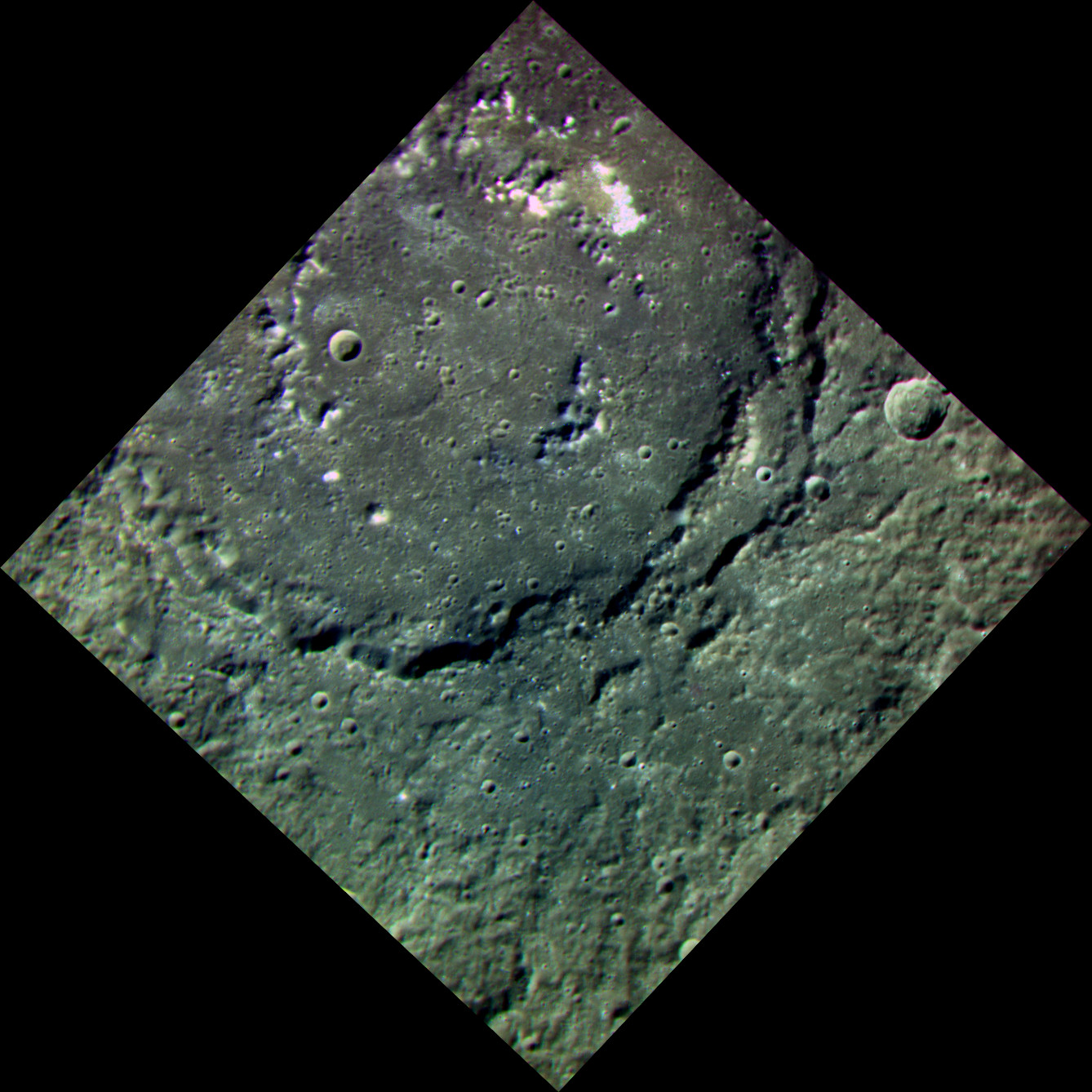
Part of Larrocha crater in approximate color.

Larrocha is an impact crater on Mercury. It has a diameter of 196 km (122 mi), and it is one of 110 peak ring basins on Mercury. It is located in the Victoria quadrangle (H-2 quadrangle) at 43.29°N 69.83°W.

Larrocha was named after Spanish pianist Alicia de Larrocha; this name was adopted by the International Astronomical Union (IAU) on June 18, 2013.

Larrocha contains abundant hollows, including a large patch on the east side that is over 15 km long.

== See also ==
- List of craters on Mercury
