= Geddes (crater) =

Crater on Mercury

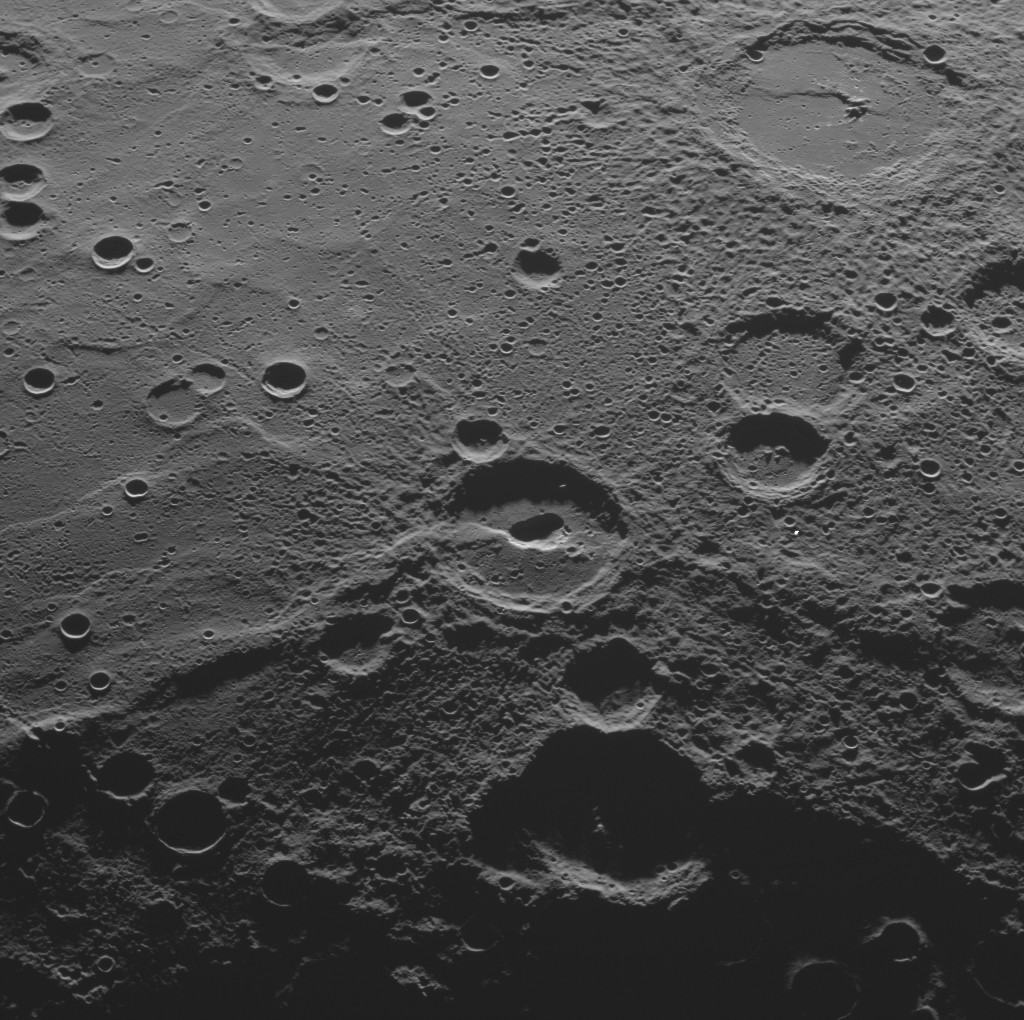
- Geddes crater at center and Ts'ai Wen-Chi in upper right
- Feature type: Impact crater
- Location: Victoria quadrangle, Mercury
- Coordinates: 27.2°N 29.6°W
- Diameter: 84 km (52 mi)
- Eponym: Wilhelmina Geddes

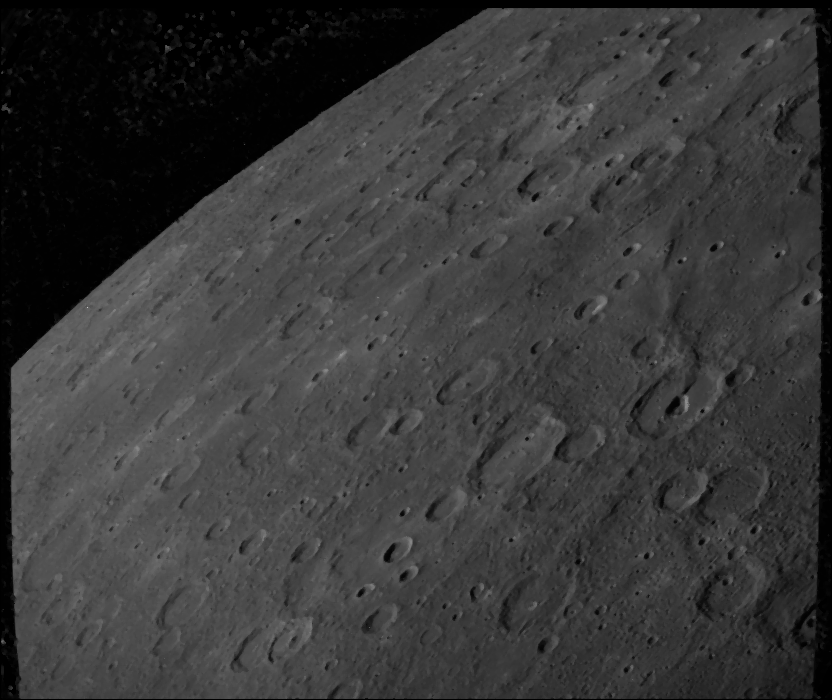
Mariner 10 image with Geddes at right

Geddes is a crater on Mercury. It has a diameter of 84 kilometers. Its name was adopted by the International Astronomical Union (IAU) in 2010. Geddes is named for the Irish stained glass artist Wilhelmina Geddes, who lived from 1887 to 1955.

Within Geddes is a relatively large irregular depression, making it a pit-floor crater. Such pits are thought to be caused by volcanic activity.

Antoniadi Dorsum cuts across Geddes crater. Wren crater is to the west.

== Hollows ==
Hollows are present on the floor of Geddes crater, mostly at the rims of smaller craters within it, and along the rim of the central depression.

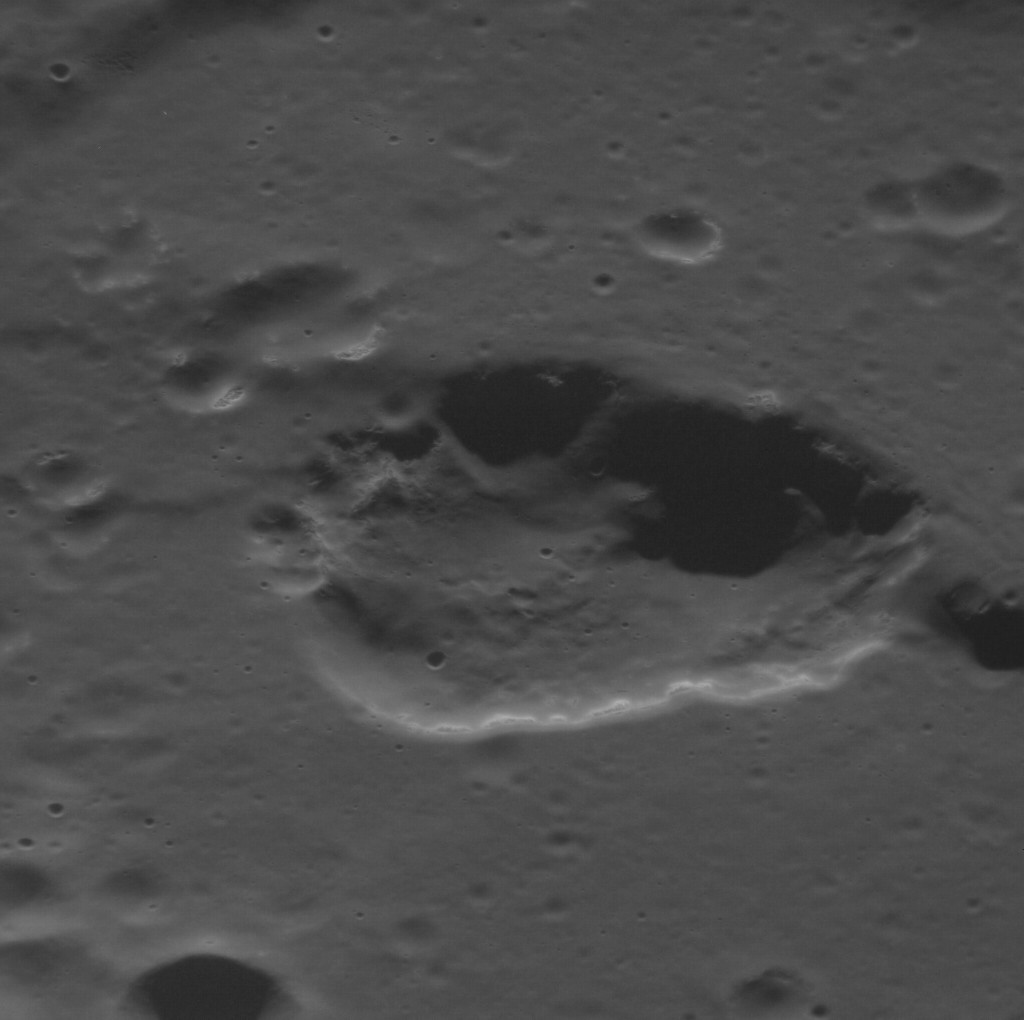
The central depression of Geddes is irregular in shape and may be a collapse feature rather than an impact crater

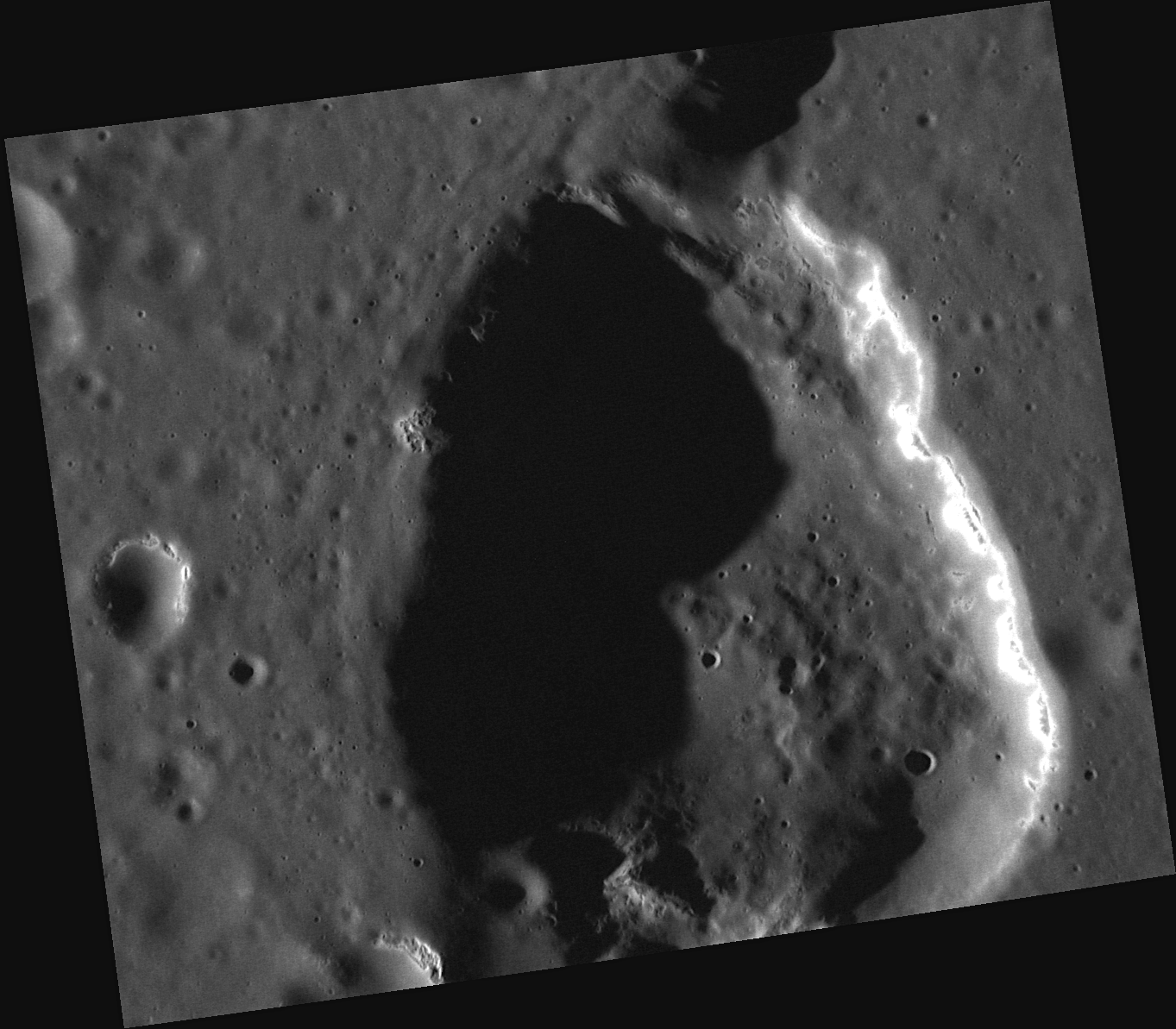
Higher resolution view of the central depression

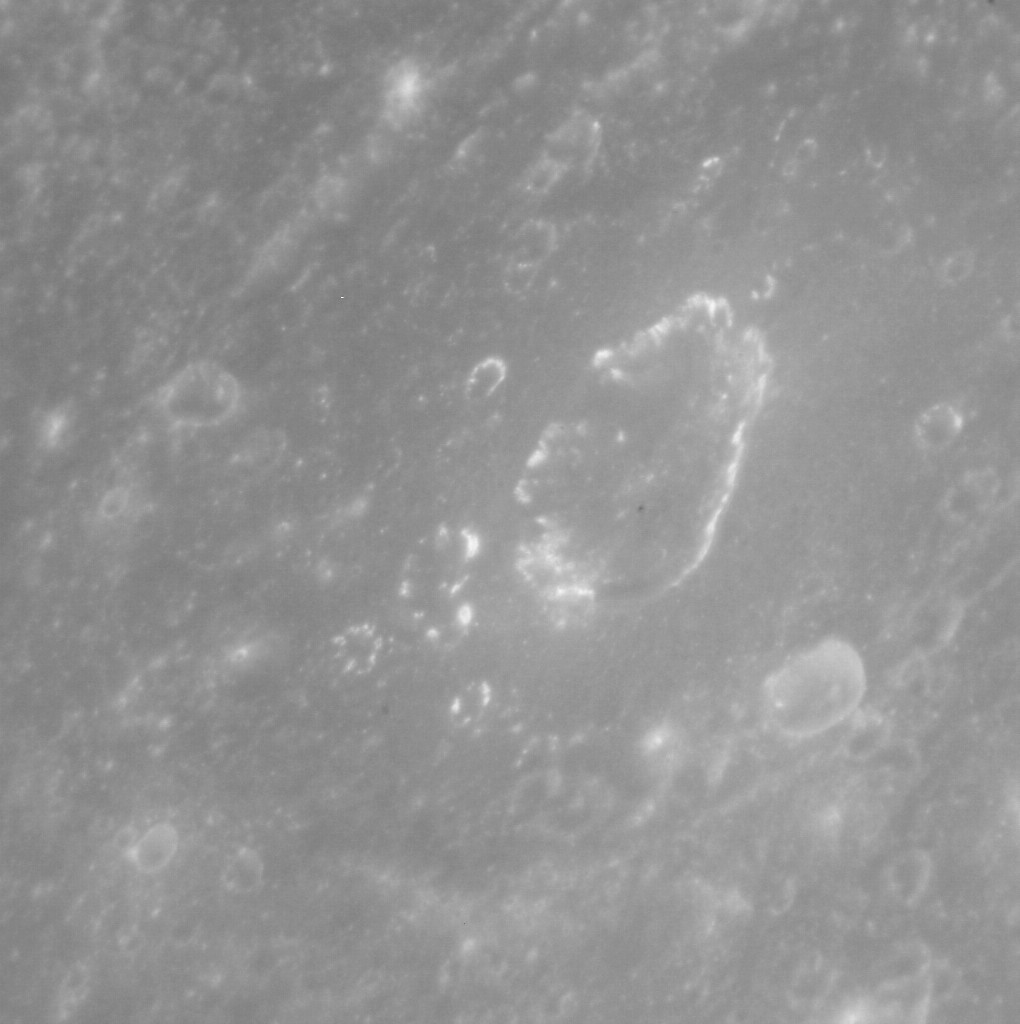
View of Geddes at a high sun angle, where the hollows are visible as bright spots
