= Plath (crater) =

Crater on Mercury

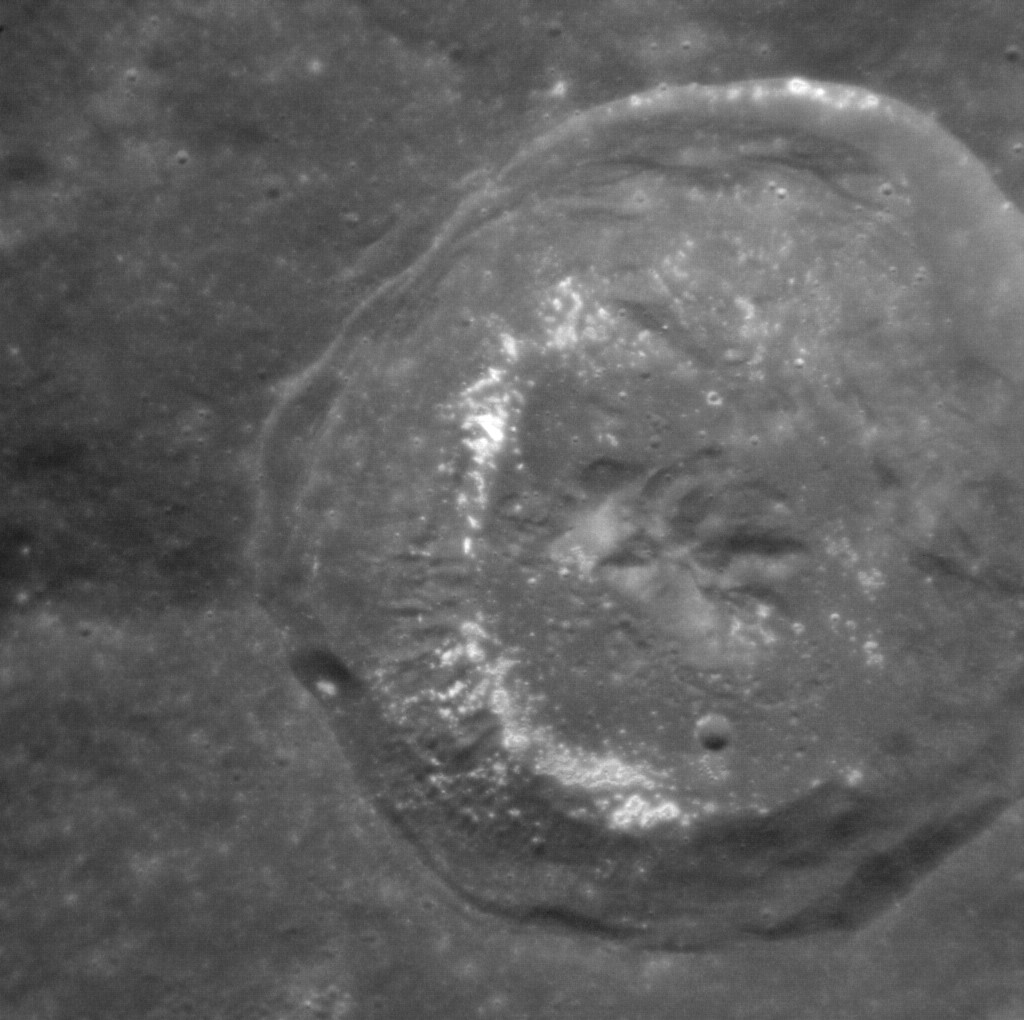
- MESSENGER NAC
- Planet: Mercury
- Coordinates: 37.86°N 38.84°W
- Quadrangle: Victoria
- Diameter: 35 km (22 mi)
- Eponym: Sylvia Plath

Plath is a crater on Mercury. Its name was adopted by the International Astronomical Union (IAU) in 2015. The crater is named for American poet Sylvia Plath.

Plath contains hollows.

Plath is just south of the crater Sōseki.

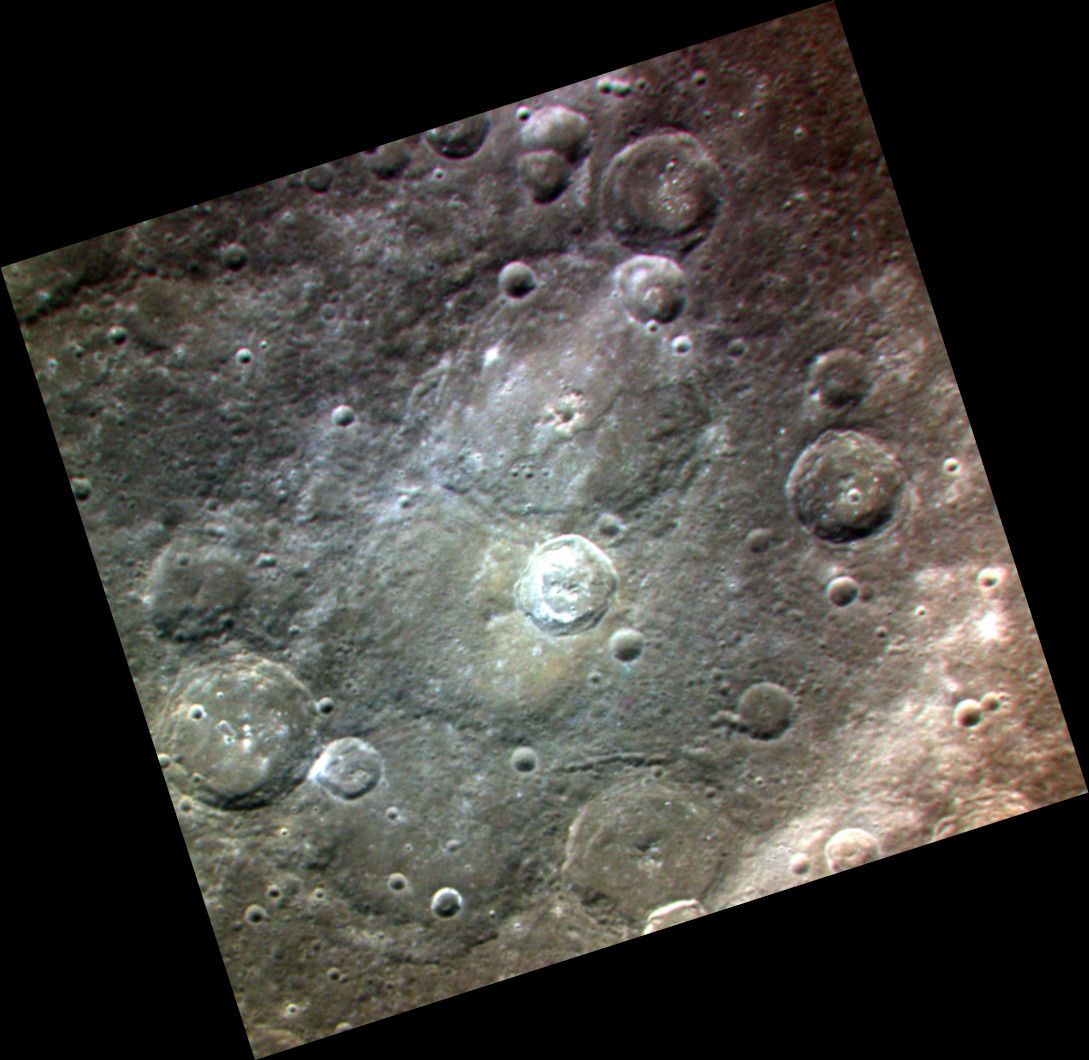
Exaggerated color image with Plath at center

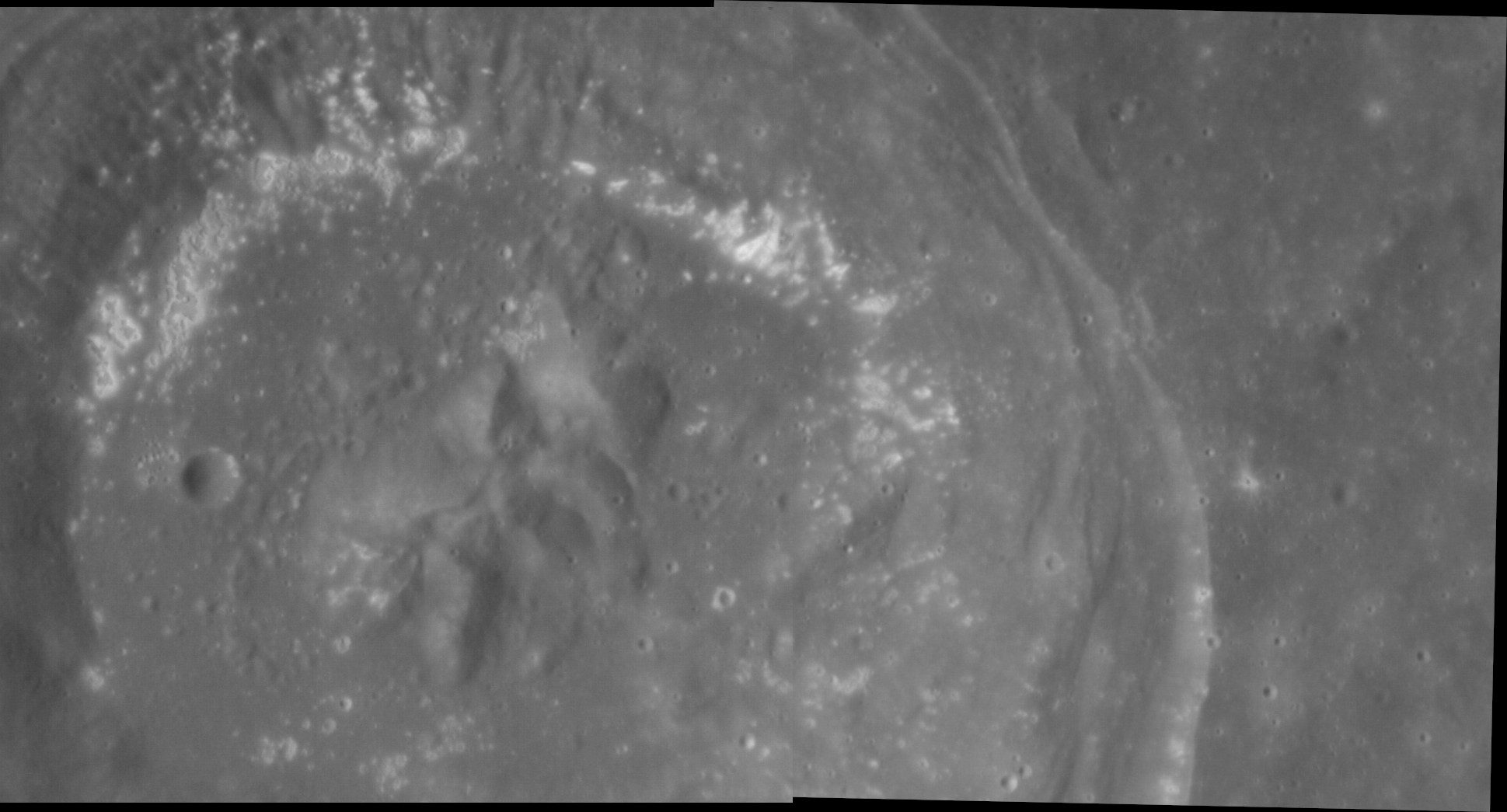
Detail of hollows in Plath crater
