= Sor Juana (crater) =

Crater on Mercury

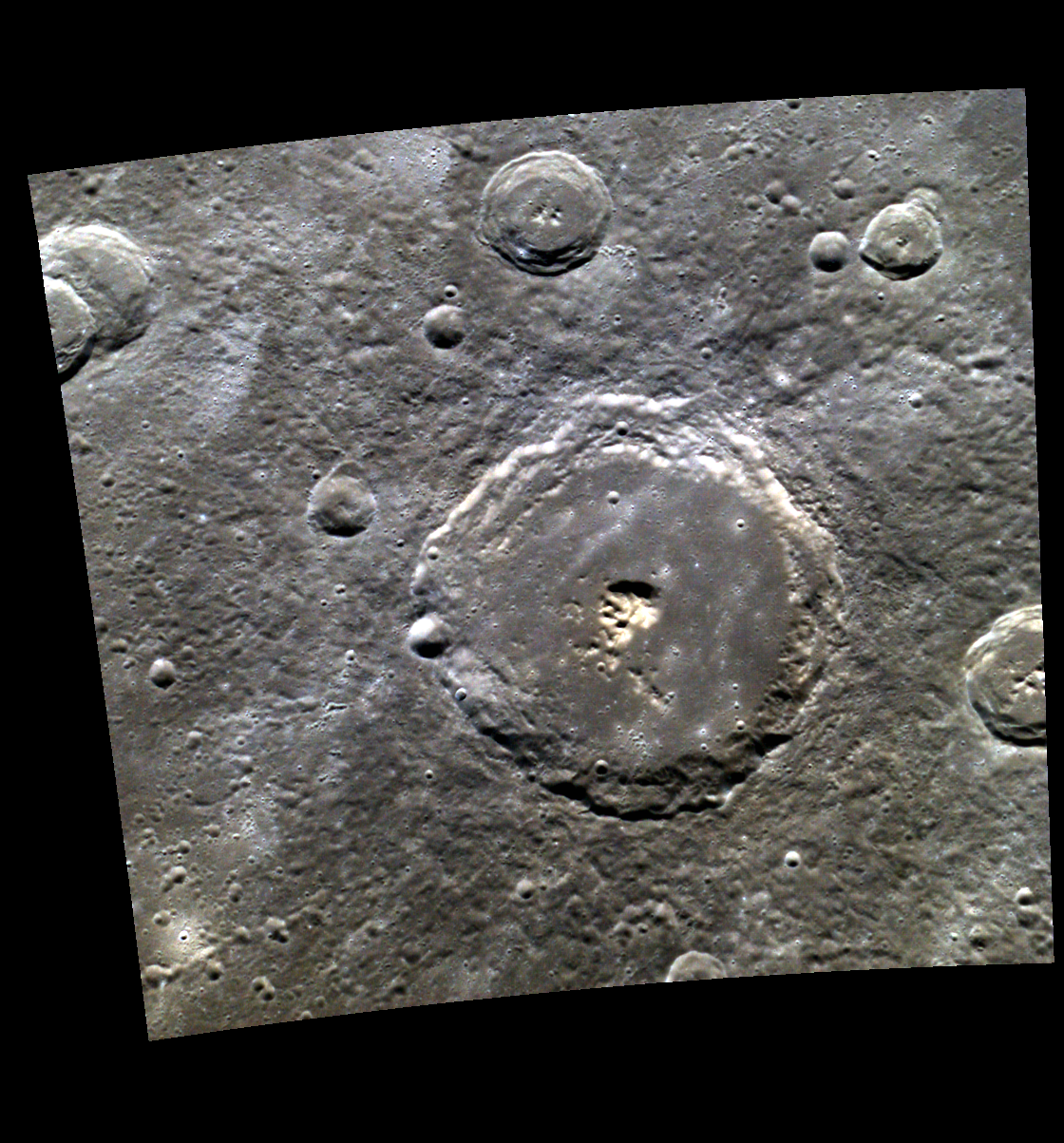
- MESSENGER image
- Planet: Mercury
- Coordinates: 50.51°N 25.59°W
- Quadrangle: Victoria
- Diameter: 102 km (63 mi)
- Eponym: Juana Inés de la Cruz

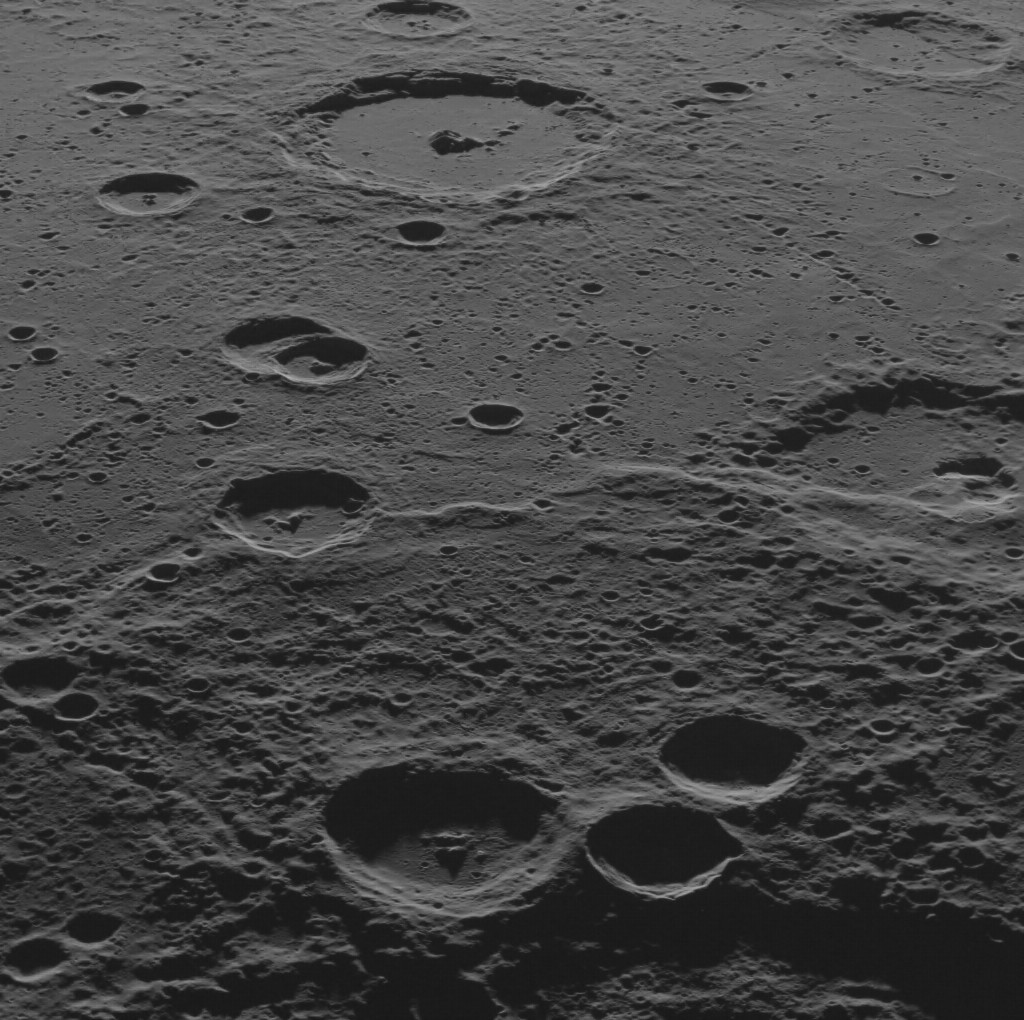
Victoria Rupes trends north–south across the center of this MESSENGER image. Sor Juana crater is in the background.

Sor Juana is a crater on Mercury. Its name was adopted by the International Astronomical Union (IAU) in 1979, and is named for the Mexican writer and poet Sor Juana Inés de la Cruz. The crater was first imaged by Mariner 10 in 1974.

Sor Juana is a relatively young crater as its floor is covered with impact melt, but it does not have a ray system such as that of Hokusai or Kuiper.

Sor Juana lies east of Victoria Rupes.
