= Victoria quadrangle =

Quadrangle on Mercury

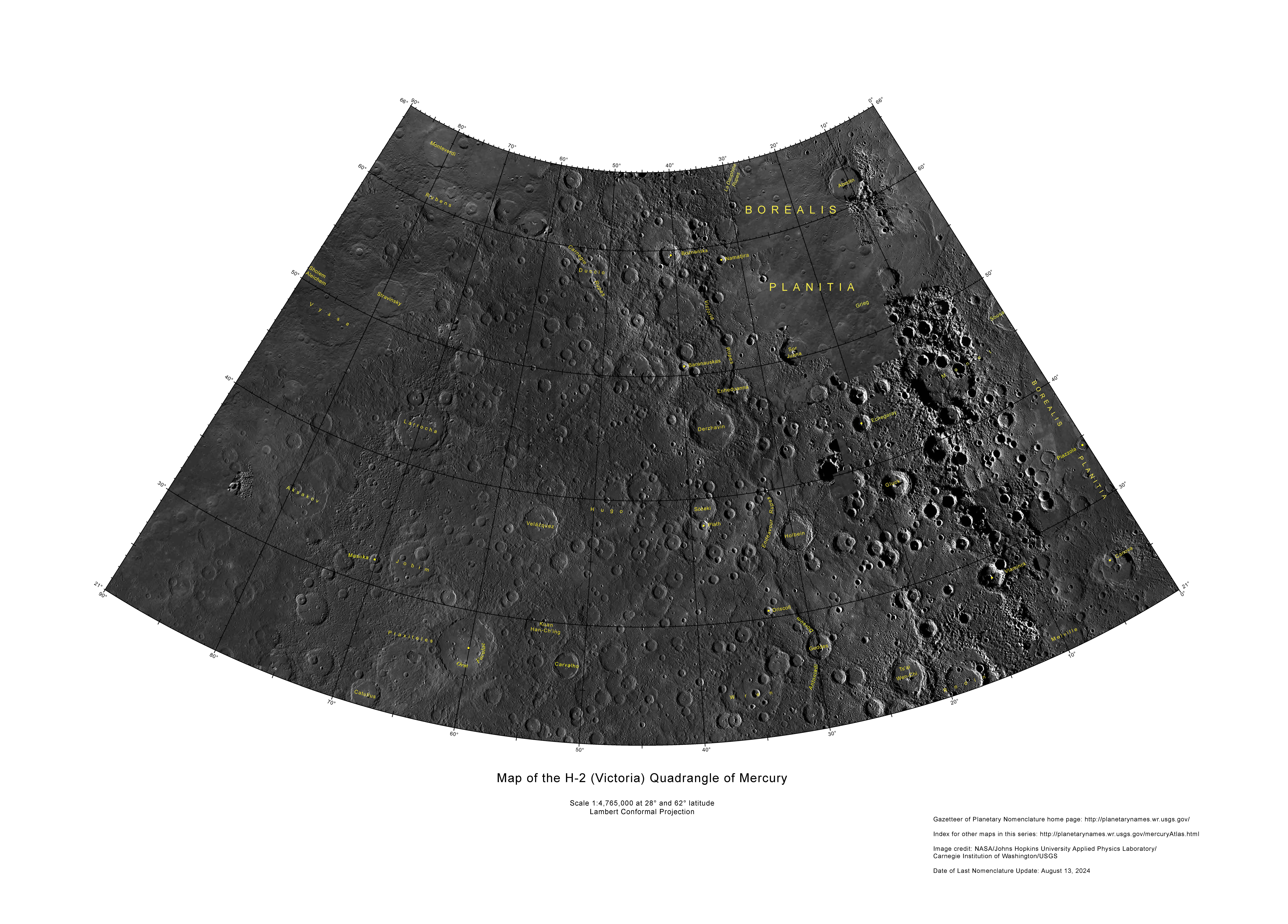
Victoria quadrangle as mapped by the MESSENGER spacecraft

The Victoria quadrangle is a region on Mercury from 0 to 90° longitude and 20 to 70 ° latitude. It is designated the "H-2" quadrangle, and is also known as Aurora after a large albedo feature.

Most of the Victoria quadrangle lies within an area that appears bright on telescopic images of the planet, the bright-albedo feature Aurora, which approximately coincides with the east half of the quadrangle. As is common with most of the imaged portions of Mercury, the Victoria quadrangle is dominated by basins and large craters, with plains materials occupying the areas between them.

The Borealis quadrangle is north of Victoria quadrangle. To the west is Shakespeare quadrangle, and to the east is Hokusai quadrangle. To the south is Kuiper quadrangle, and to the southwest is Beethoven quadrangle.

== Mariner 10 images ==
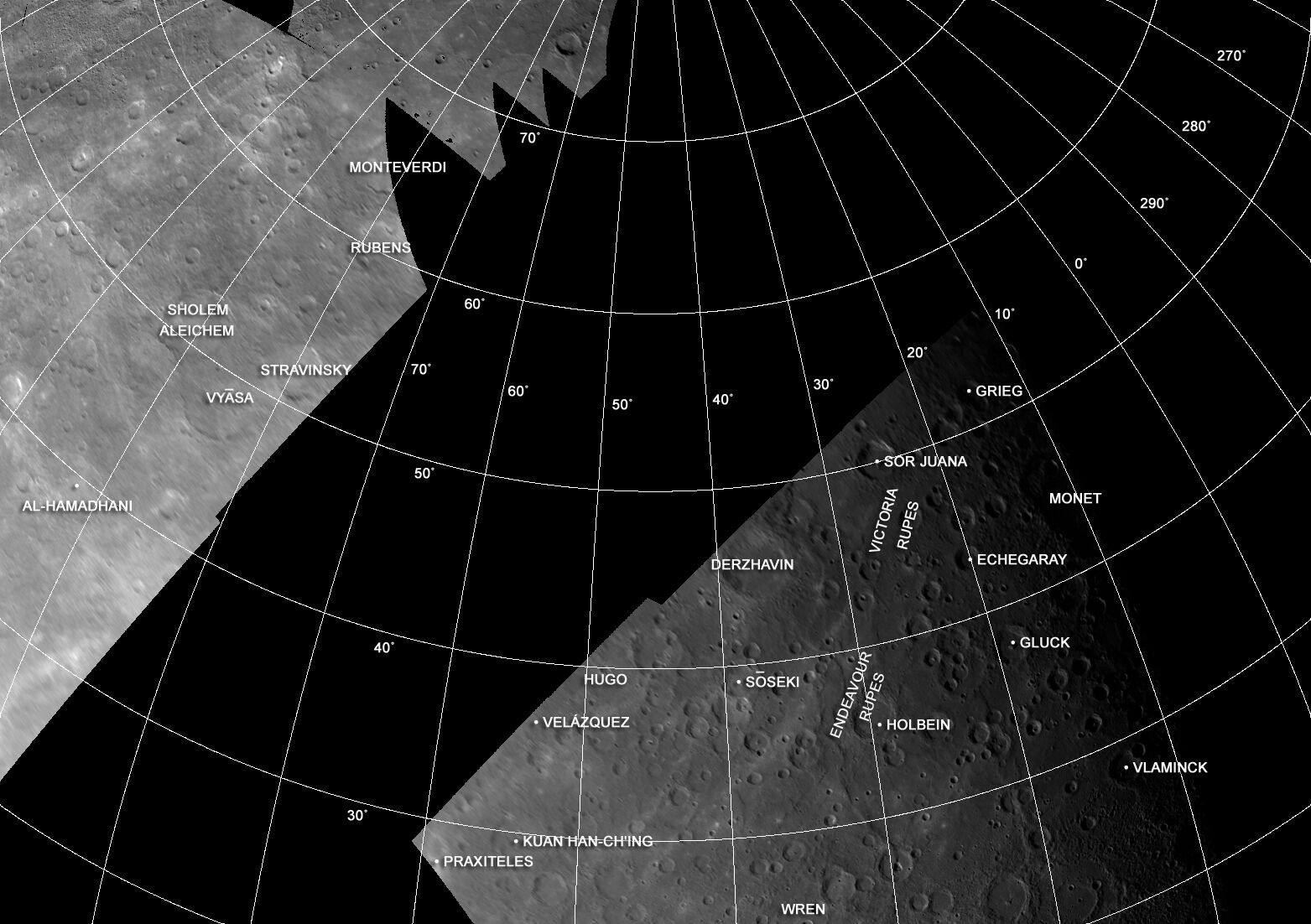
Mariner 10 photomosaic of the Victoria quadrangle

Almost all the pictures acquired by Mariner 10 that were used for mapping were obtained during the first encounter: those covering the southeast half of the quadrangle are incoming close-encounter images, and those covering the north-west corner are outgoing close-encounter images. At the time the pictures were obtained, the terminator was at about longitude 7° to 8°, within the eastern part of the quadrangle. A large gap in coverage between the incoming and outgoing images appears as a northeast-trending diagonal blank strip on the base map. A small part of this gap was filled in the southwestern part of the quadrangle by very poor second-encounter images.

No images provide a vertical view; in fact, the smallest angle between the planetary surface normal and the camera axis is about 50°. The high obliquity of the images, the wide range in sun-elevation angles, and the complete transection of the quadrangle by the gap in coverage greatly hamper geologic mapping. Only in about 15 percent of the quadrangle, near the southeast corner, do data permit separation of units with the confidence possible in other quadrangles on Mercury.

== MESSENGER images ==
The MESSENGER spacecraft mapped all of Mercury's quadrangles at much greater detail than that of Mariner 10, filling the large photographic gap discussed above. Prominent features such as Praxiteles, Stravinsky, Derzhavin, and Wren craters that were only poorly imaged by Mariner 10 were shown in great detail by MESSENGER. Others such as Jobim, Aksakov, Larrocha, and Duccio craters were shown for the first time.

== Stratigraphy ==
Three widespread units are recognized within the Victoria quadrangle. These are, from oldest to youngest, intercrater plains material, intermediate plains material, and smooth plains material. In addition, central peak, floor, rim, and ejecta materials related to the numerous craters and basins larger than about 20 km in diameter are mapped. The simplicity of the stratigraphic scheme is at least in part due to deficiencies in the data base; the history of plains formation almost certainly is more complex than our threefold division indicates, but we were not able to define consistent criteria of albedo, texture, and cratering for more than three plains units because of the highly variable quality of available pictures.

=== Intercrater plains material ===
About half of the intercrater area consists of material characterized by a very high density of small, mostly degraded craters, and an irregular to rough surface. Superposition relations suggest that this unit is about the same age as, or older than, all mappable craters and basins. The origin of intercrater plains material is enigmatic; some may be primitive crust, as implied by Trask and Guest, but more likely it is of mixed origin, dominated by breccias formed by now-unrecognizable ancient craters. Some of the more plainslike areas included within this unit may well have an origin similar to that of intermediate plains material.

=== Cratered plains material ===
Within the 5° overlap area with the Kuiper quadrangle to the south, an area has been mapped that displays moderately rough to rough terrain and a high density of mostly degraded craters. This unit is very similar to intercrater plains material, and cannot be distinguished from it anywhere else in the Victoria quadrangle. Most of the cratered plains material is probably volcanic in origin, but some of it may consist of impact breccias.

=== Intermediate plains material ===
Smooth to moderately irregular plains occupy most of the area between large craters not underlain by intercrater plains material. These plains superficially resemble the plains of the lunar maria; they generally have a relatively low albedo and are characterized by numerous elongate ridges. Like the lunar maria, the two younger mercurian plains units have been ascribed to volcanic activity, although this interpretation has been questioned. A volcanic origin seems most probable, but no compelling evidence exists in the Victoria quadrangle to support this opinion.

The elongate ridges, though clearly associated with intermediate plains material, are not restricted to it. Locally, ridges extend into intercrater plains material adjacent to intermediate plains material, and large young (c4 and c3) craters superposed on the intermediate plains material commonly are transected by these ridges .

=== Smooth plains material ===
Partly filling most craters is plains material that is smoother and less densely cratered than intermediate plains material. Because most areas underlain by this unit are enclosed within craters, contacts between smooth plains and older plains units are rare. Smooth plains material thus is defined almost entirely by texture and apparent crater density. Few superposition data directly support the inferred age sequence, but the relative youth of the smooth plains unit is indicated by its presence on the floors of craters that are superposed on intermediate plains material. The smooth plains unit probably includes materials of a wide range in age, but the exposed areas are too small to test this possibility quantitatively. Although a volcanic origin cannot be ruled out for all or part of the smooth plains material, it is more probably a mixture of ejecta from very small craters and colluvium mass wasted from crater walls.

== Structure ==
The ridges associated with the intermediate plains unit are best interpreted as tectonic in origin because they extend into adjacent exposures of intercrater plains material and, more significantly, because they transect ejecta, rims, and floors of craters. The ridges range in length from about 50 km to many hundreds of kilometers, are sinuous to lobate in plan, and generally trend about north-south. Most are asymmetric, with one slope steeper than the other, and at places they can be more logically referred to as rounded scarps. Commonly, an individual ridge changes along trend from symmetric ridge to asymmetric ridge to rounded scarp. Strom and others interpreted most of these features to be surface expressions of thrust faults, and we can find no evidence within the Victoria quadrangle not already considered in their discussion.

Because of their globally systematic orientations, these ridges and scarps have been associated with stresses developed by tidal despinning of Mercury. However, most trend approximately north-south and thus do not fit the pattern expected in the midlatitude belt, unless stresses from overall contraction were superposed on the stresses due to despinning.

== Geologic history ==
The oldest material and features in the Victoria quadrangle are the intercrater plains material and areally associated, severely degraded basins. No craters are clearly older than intercrater plains material, and the relative ages of the cl basins are ambiguous. Numerous large craters are superposed on intercrater plains material; by analogy with lunar and martian history these craters most likely date from more than about 4 b.y. ago.

The available evidence suggests a relatively long history of plains formation. Some of the material included in the intercrater plains unit appears to have been plainslike before the intense cratering characteristic of the unit. In addition, the younger plains units exhibit densities of superposed craters ranging from moderate to very sparse. The intermediate plains material is older than the freshest large craters (100–150 km in diameter) but younger than all basins, and younger than all large craters that are more than moderately degraded. Thus, the material mapped as the intermediate plains unit overlaps in time of origin the tail end of the primordial bombardment.

The stresses responsible for the elongate ridges and scarps must have occurred after the end of the primordial bombardment and after emplacement of the intermediate plains unit. Where smooth plains material abuts ridges and scarps, the evidence is mostly ambiguous because we cannot tell if ridge formation involved smooth plains material or if the ridges are upwarped intermediate plains material with smooth plains material ponded against them. On the floors of some craters, such as Gluck, scarps apparently offset material mapped as smooth plains, but the exposures are so small that this interpretation could easily be challenged. Ridges appear to be both older and younger than medium-size craters (30–60 km in diameter) on the intermediate plains unit, but intersections of ridges with craters in this size range are too rare to constrain the time of ridge formation. Thus, ridge formation obviously occurred after emplacement of the intermediate plains unit, but how long after remains uncertain in this quadrangle.

Smooth plains material is apparently younger than all large craters, and hence is the youngest material in the quadrangle with the exception of the local material related to some very small craters (<20 km in diameter).

== Crater distributions ==
Because of the varied and generally poor quality of the imagery, detailed cratering history cannot be inferred from these plots. However, three observations seem valid:

- the density of large craters is distinctly higher for intercrater than for intermediate plains material;
- for the intercrater and intermediate plains material, curves for craters with diameters between 3 and 15 km nearly coincide (the abundant, mostly degraded small craters characteristic of intercrater plains material but not characteristic of intermediate plains material are less than 3 km in diameter);
- craters of all sizes on the smooth plains unit are much less abundant than on the other units, although the smooth-plains plot is unreliable in detail because of the small total number of craters counted and the need to combine counts from isolated exposures.

A serious sampling problem exists for counting craters on the intermediate plains unit, because those in the diameter range of 50 to 150 km commonly occur in clusters, and it is very difficult to determine which craters of a cluster are younger than the surrounding plains unit and which are older.

== Sources ==
- McGill, George E.; Elbert A. King (1983). "Geologic Map Of The Victoria (H-2) Quadrangle Of Mercury" (PDF). Prepared for the National Aeronautics and Space Administration by U.S. Department of the Interior, U.S. Geological Survey. Published in hardcopy as USGS Miscellaneous Investigations Series Map I–1409, as part of the Atlas of Mercury, 1:5,000,000 Geologic Series. Hardcopy is available for sale from U.S. Geological Survey, Information Services, Box 25286, Federal Center, Denver, CO 80225

H-1 Borealis (features)
H-5 Hokusai (features)	H-4 Raditladi (features)	H-3 Shakespeare (features)		H-2 Victoria (features)
H-10 Derain (features)	H-9 Eminescu (features)	H-8 Tolstoj (features)	H-7 Beethoven (features)	H-6 Kuiper (features)
H-14 Debussy (features)	H-13 Neruda (features)	H-12 Michelangelo (features)		H-11 Discovery (features)
H-15 Bach (features)
