= Prokofiev (disambiguation) =

Prokofiev most commonly refers to Sergei Prokofiev (1891–1953), Russian composer.

Prokofiev, Prokofyev or Prokofieff may also refer to:

- Prokofiev (surname)
- Prokofiev (song), 1991 song by The Damned
- Prokofiev (crater), on Mercury
- Sergei O. Prokofieff (Christian esotericist, grandson of Sergei Prokofiev)
- Gabriel Prokofiev (Composer, grandson of Sergei Prokofiev)
