= Prokofiev (surname) =

Prokofiev (also spelled Prokofyev) is a Russian surname. Derived from the Greek male given name Προκόπιος. Notable people with the surname include:

- Alexander Prokofyev (1900–1971), Soviet poet
- Aleksander Prokofiev (1942—2007), Russian ballet dancer, teacher and choreographer
- Andrey Prokofyev (1959–1989), Soviet athlete
- Artem Prokofiev (born 1983), Russian politician
- Gabriel Prokofiev (born 1975), England-based composer and music producer.
- Georgy Prokofiev (1902–1939), Soviet balloonist
- Oleg Prokofiev (1928–1998), Russian artist, sculptor and poet, son of the composer Sergei Prokofiev.
- Pavel Prokofiev, birth name of Pavel Prokkonen (1909–1979), Karelian Soviet politician.
- Sergei Prokofiev (1891—1953), Russian composer and pianist.
- Sergei Prokofieff (1954–2014), Russian anthroposophist
- Stanislav Prokofiev (born 1968), Russian economist, rector of Financial University under the Government of the Russian Federation
- Stanislav Prokofyev (born 1987), Russian footballer
