= Iain Chambers =

Iain Chambers may refer to:

- Iain Chambers (musician), English composer, producer and performer
- Iain Michael Chambers, sociologist, historian and cultural studies scholar
