= Carolan (crater) =

Crater on Mercury

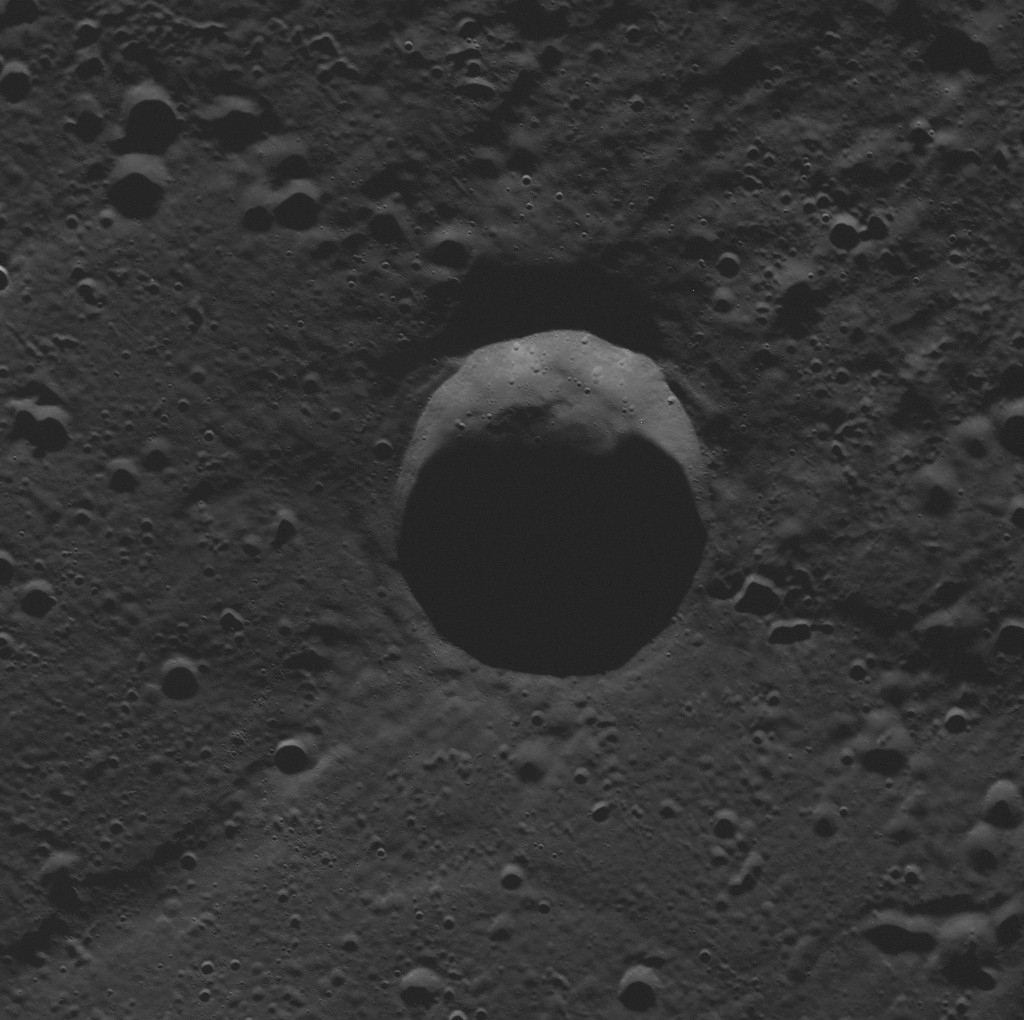
- MESSENGER WAC image of Carolan
- Feature type: Impact crater
- Location: Borealis quadrangle, Mercury
- Coordinates: 83.88°N 31.77°E
- Diameter: 24.34 km (15.12 mi)
- Eponym: Turlough O'Carolan

Carolan is a crater on Mercury. Its name was suggested by an Irishman, Fergal Donnelly, and two Americans, Joseph Brusseau and Deane Morrison, in a naming contest which was eventually adopted by the International Astronomical Union (IAU) on 30 April 2015. Carolan is named for the Irish composer and performer Turlough O'Carolan, who lived from 1670 to 1738 C.E. The craters Kulthum, Enheduanna, Karsh, and Rivera were also named as part of the contest.

S band radar data from the Arecibo Observatory collected between 1999 and 2005 indicates a radar-bright area along the southern interior of Carolan, which is probably indicative of a water ice deposit, and lies within the permanently shadowed part of the crater. MESSENGER's Mercury Laser Altimeter (MLA) was used to measure surface reflectance of the surface of the planet, and the radar-bright material is covered by low-reflectance material.

Carolan lies to the southwest of the large crater Prokofiev.
