= John Richards (musician) =

British musician and composer

John Stephen Richards (born 1966 in Bideford, Devon, England) is a British musician and composer working in the field of electronic music. Since 1999, he has predominantly explored performing with self-made instruments and creating interactive environments for composition.

In the mid-1990s, Richards’ works began to be recognised amongst the electroacoustic community. He received a mention at the Institut International de Musique Electroacoustique de Bourges in 1997, and in the same year had a work performed at Huddersfield Contemporary Music Festival. In 1996, along with Nick Fells, Dylan Menzies, Gabriel Prokofiev, and Timothy Ward, Richards formed nerve8: an experimental sound diffusion group.

Richards’ work with the post-punk group Sand (Soul Jazz Records) and kREEPA has also received international recognition. kREEPA was formed in 2000 with Hilary Jeffery, who Richards met at Dartington International Summer School in 1990. Key contributors to the work of kREEPA have been British saxophonist Paul Dunmall and contra-bass recorder player Cesar Villavicencio. Since 2004, the group has also worked closely with Nicholas Bullen (founder member of Napalm Death and Scorn), and have released material on Bullen’s label Monium. Whilst working with kREEPA, Richards developed the kreepback instrument: an assemblage of self-built sound generating devices and discarded analogue audio hardware patched together to create a feedback labyrinth. His connection with Gabriel Prokofiev has continued, and he released in different guises pieces on Prokofiev’s nonclassical label, the most notable of these being a work for piano and electronics performed by GéNIA with re-mixes by Vex'd and Max De Wardener amongst others.

John Richards coined the terms dirty electronics to describe an approach within electronic music that shirks working with corporate technology and virtualness and focuses on a do-it-yourself ethos, found objects and the physical in relation to the human body. Richards also began to explore these ideas through workshops and performances. In 2003, he formed the Dirty Electronics Ensemble, a large group that is often made-up of workshop participants where making things and performances are intrinsically linked. The group have performed specially commissioned pieces by Merzbow, Pauline Oliveros, Howard Skempton (founder member of the Scratch Orchestra), Gabriel Prokofiev and Nicholas Bullen (ex-Napalm Death and Scorn). Other notable collaborations have included working with Rolf Gehlhaar (original Stockhausen group), Chris Carter from Throbbing Gristle, Keith Rowe and STEIM (Amsterdam). As Dirty Electronics, Richards has explored the intersection between artwork/copper etching and printed circuit board in a number of touch instruments. In 2011, Dirty Electronics collaborated with graphic designer Adrian Shaughnessy to create a specially commissioned hand-held synth for Mute Records. Dirty Electronics workshops and performances have taken place internationally including Japan, United States, Europe and Australia.

John Richards studied at Dartington College of Arts and the University of York where he completed a PhD in electroacoustic music in 2002. In 1999, he joined Andrew Hugill and Leigh Landy as part of the Music, Technology and Innovation Research Group, now MTIRC, at De Montfort University where he helped initiate the Music, Technology and Innovation, and Music, Technology and Performance degrees. He has written a number of academic papers and articles on contemporary electronic music that in particular cover postdigital theory, new modes of performance and hybridity.
