= Langham Research Centre =

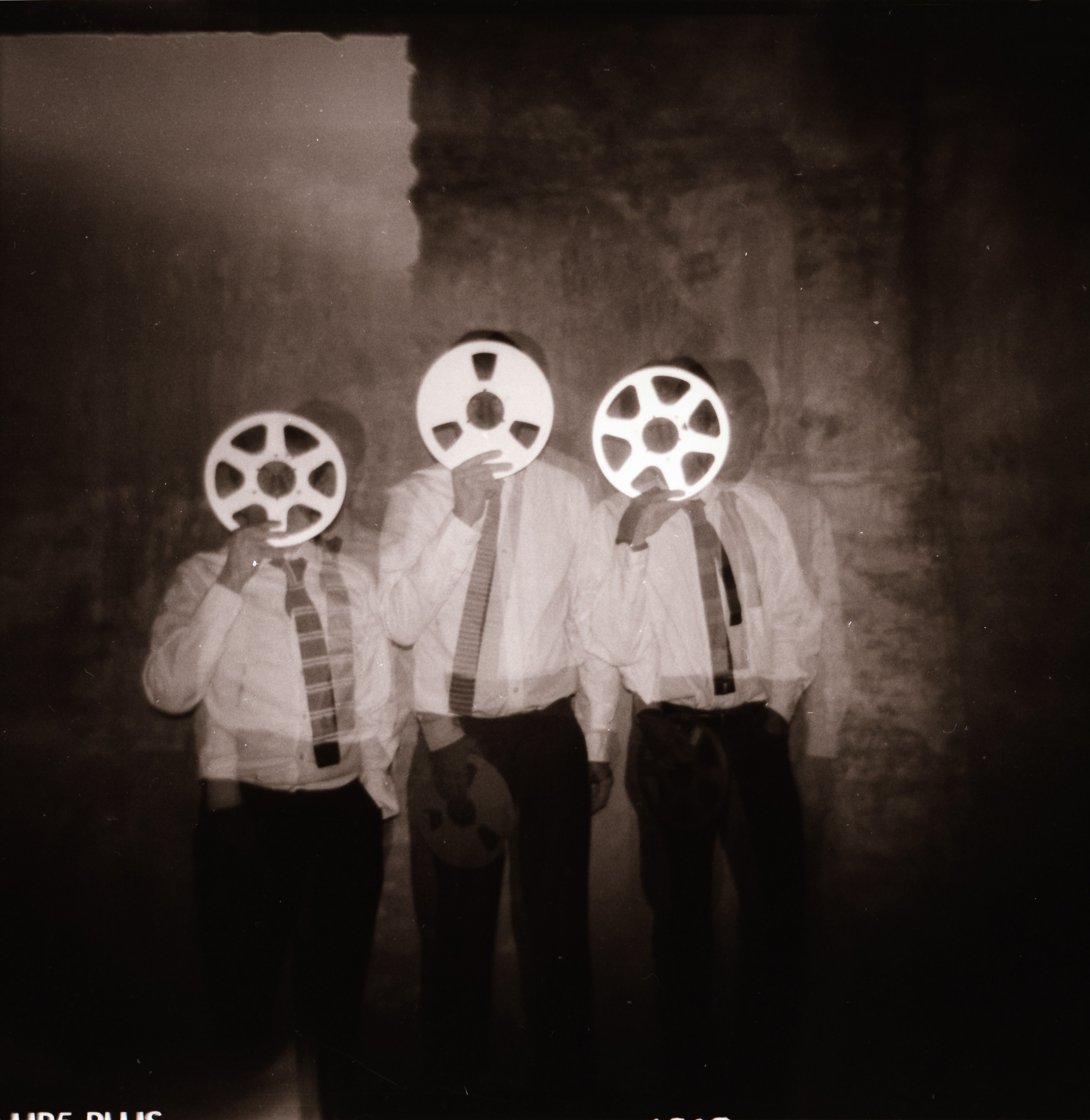
- Langham Research Centre with empty tape spools

Background information
- Genres: Musique concrète, experimental
- Years active: 2003–present
- Labels: Sub Rosa, Nonclassical, Econore, Never Anything Records
- Members: Felix Carey; Iain Chambers; Philip Tagney; Robert Worby
- Website: www.langhamresearch.co.uk

Langham Research Centre is a group devoted to authentic performances of classic electronic music, and the creation of new music from their instrumentarium of vintage analogue devices. Founded in August 2003, they comprise the composers / producers Felix Carey, Iain Chambers, Philip Tagney, and Robert Worby. Their new music follows in the traditions of the Radiophonic Workshop, using reel-to-reel tape machines, sine wave oscillators and other vintage machinery abandoned by the BBC.

Radiophonic works include two editions of BBC Radio 3's Between The Ears: guest+host=ghost, featuring Peter Blegvad and Nick Cave; and Gateshead multi-storey car park, featuring the infamous building from Get Carter.

Their work includes OBAMIX, a musique concrète chorale for treated soprano, setting extracts from 3 of Barack Obama's defining speeches. This premiered in February 2013 with soprano Alwynne Pritchard performing alongside Langham Research Centre at London's Kings Place. LRC have since performed OBAMIX at the European Court of Human Rights in Strasbourg, and at the Supreme Court of the United Kingdom.

In March 2013, Langham Research Centre's new work, Eschatology, was performed with Peter Blegvad at Borealis festival in Bergen, Norway and later broadcast live in 2014 on BBC Radio 3.

In April 2013 LRC performed music by John Cage at London's Barbican Centre alongside pianist Ian Pace and mezzo-soprano Catherine Carter, as part of the Barbican's Bride and the Bachelors exhibition, featuring the work of Marcel Duchamp, Cage, Jasper Johns and Robert Rauschenberg.

Langham Research Centre released John Cage - Early Electronic and Tape Music, an acclaimed LP/CD of new realisations of John Cage's music on the Sub Rosa label in April 2014.

In May 2014, Ny Musikk Oslo commissioned Langham Research Centre to write Muffled Cyphers, a new work in response to J. G. Ballard's 1970 modernist novel, The Atrocity Exhibition. The piece - for amplified small sounds, sine-wave oscillators and tape - was premiered at the 2014 Only Connect festival in Oslo, Norway, with slide projections by Jeremy Welsh.

In 2016 the group presented The Dark Tower, a new concert work for Spitalfields Music Summer Festival, responding to the life and work of Nikola Tesla. The work was premiered in the Pathology Museum of St Bartholomew's Hospital in London. They toured the UK with the Goldfield Ensemble, performing repertoire inspired by Cold War era technology.

In 2017 Langham Research Centre appeared at Tower Bridge's Bascule Chamber Concerts as part of Totally Thames Festival, creating a contemporary response to Handel's Water Music, exactly 300 years after that work's premiere on the Thames. The concerts featured a second new piece by the group, a work for clarinet and electronics, performed by LRC and Kate Romano.

2017 also saw the release of the first album of Langham Research Centre's own studio work, Tape Works Vol. 1, on the Nonclassical label reflects a range of works from LRC's early “musique concrète” miniatures to recent modular works of extended duration.

In 2021 the group released Tape Works Vol. 2, also through Nonclassical. The album has a focus on space and architecture, and features location recordings at Tate Modern, Orford Ness, Barbican Centre, and brutalist buildings at Ivry-sur-Seine and Bobigny in Paris. The track Dinotique also features extracts from composer Luc Ferrari's 2002 work, Les Anecdotiques.
