= Persistence of Sound =

UK record label

Persistence of Sound is a British record label. It was established in 2019 by composer Iain Chambers to release classic musique concrète, electroacoustic music, field recording, and the uncategorisable sounds in between these genres. Its first releases in 2019 featured the field recordings of the London Sound Survey, the contemporary musique concrète of Robert Worby, and Iain Chambers album of compositions from field recordings.

In 2020 the label released an album of new material by composer Beatriz Ferreyra, "Huellas Entreveradas"., followed by a further album by Ferreyra and Natasha Barrett (composer), Souvenirs cachés / Innermost, in 2021.
