= Enheduanna (crater) =

Crater on Mercury

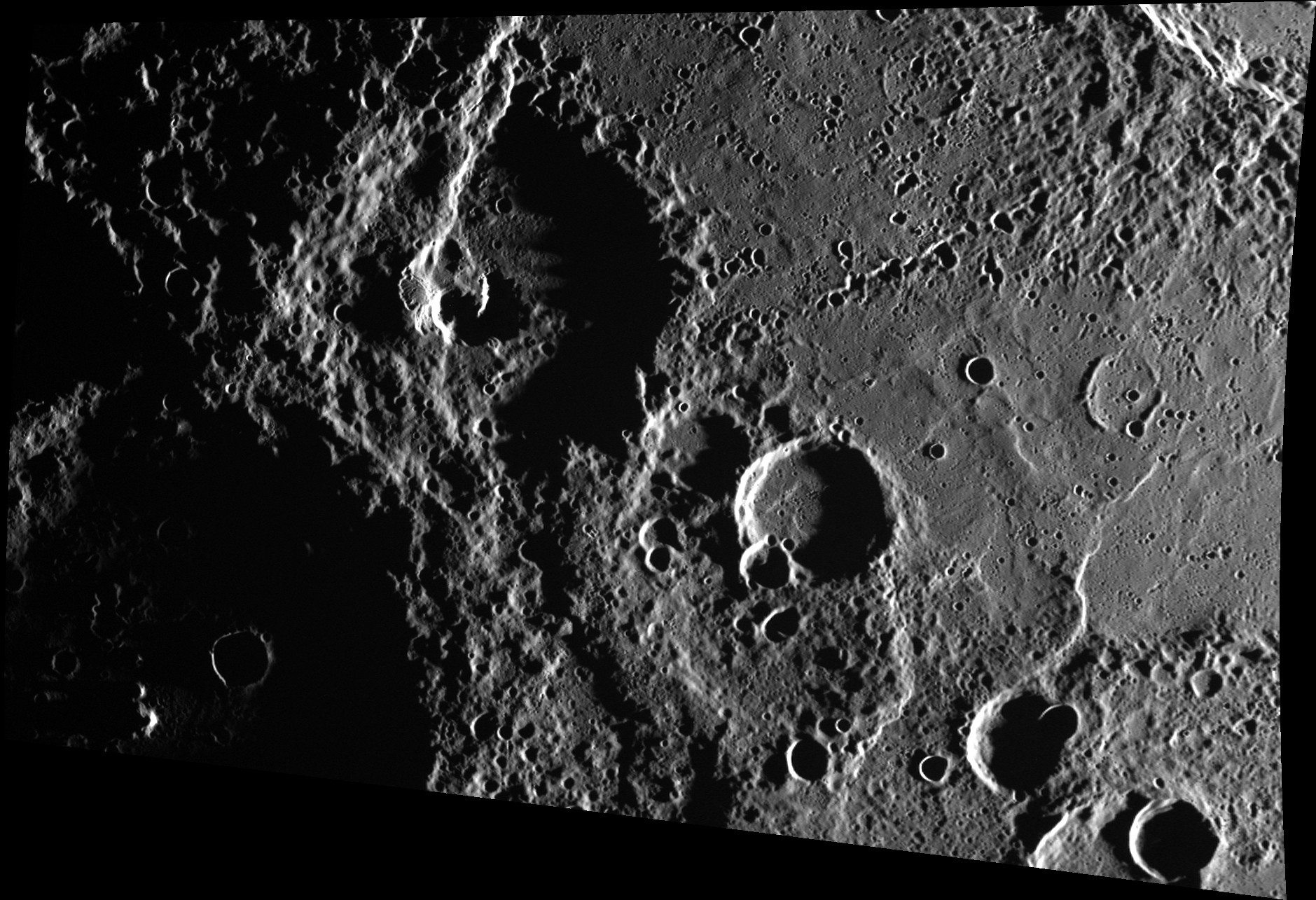
- Map-projected WAC image by MESSENGER
- Feature type: Impact crater
- Location: Victoria quadrangle, Mercury
- Coordinates: 48.34°N 33.59°W
- Diameter: 105 km (65 mi)
- Eponym: Enheduanna

Enheduanna is a crater on Mercury. It has a diameter of 105 kilometers. Its name was suggested by Gagan Toor from India in a naming contest which was eventually adopted by the International Astronomical Union (IAU) on 30 April 2015. Enheduanna is named for the Sumerian poet Enheduanna. The craters Carolan, Kulthum, Karsh, and Rivera were also named as part of the contest.

There are irregular depressions at the center of Enheduanna, which are similar to those within Navoi, Lermontov, Scarlatti, and Praxiteles. The depressions resemble those associated with volcanic explosions.

The scarp known as Victoria Rupes cuts across Enheduanna and trends to the north from it.

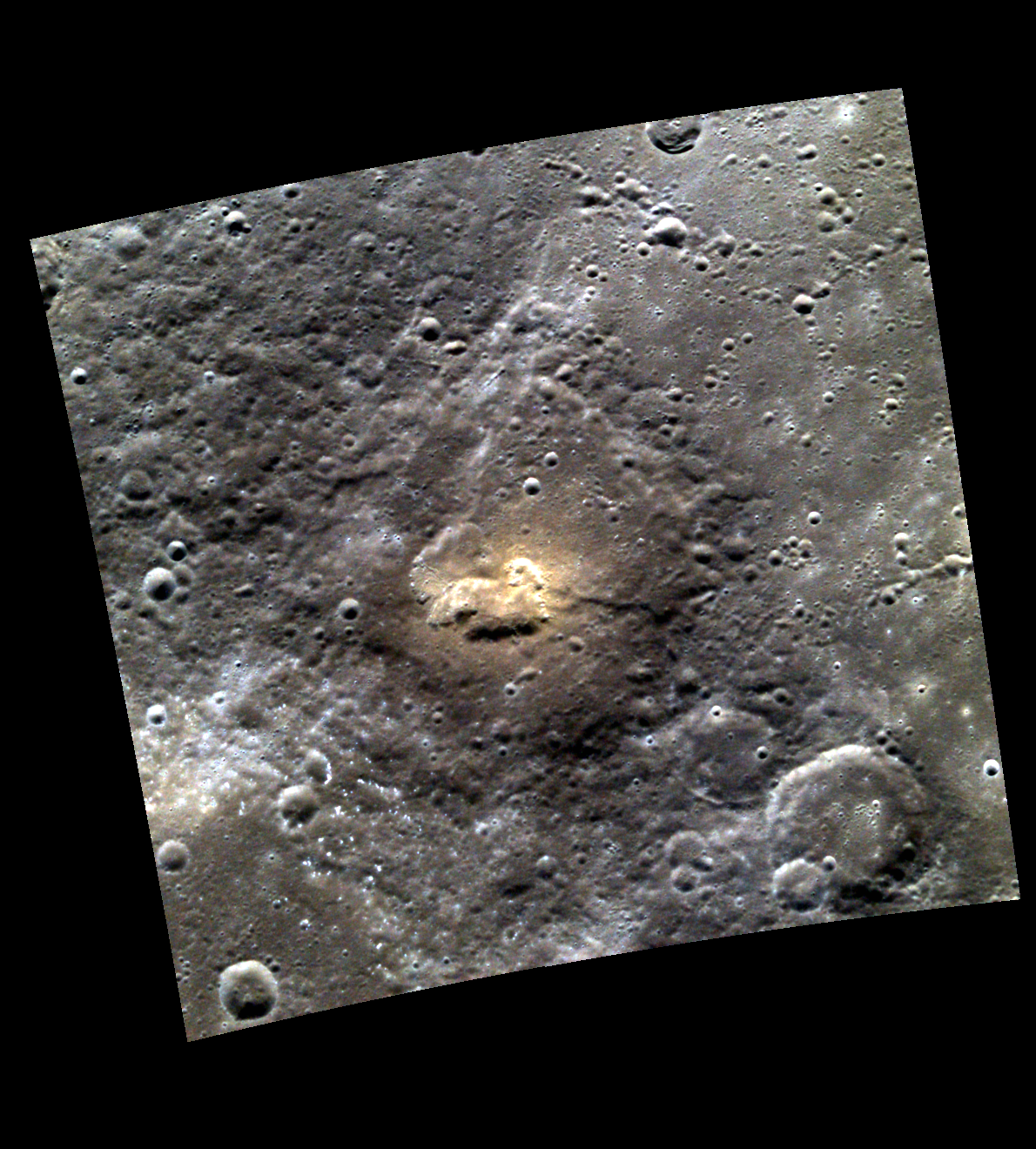
Approximate color image by MESSENGER

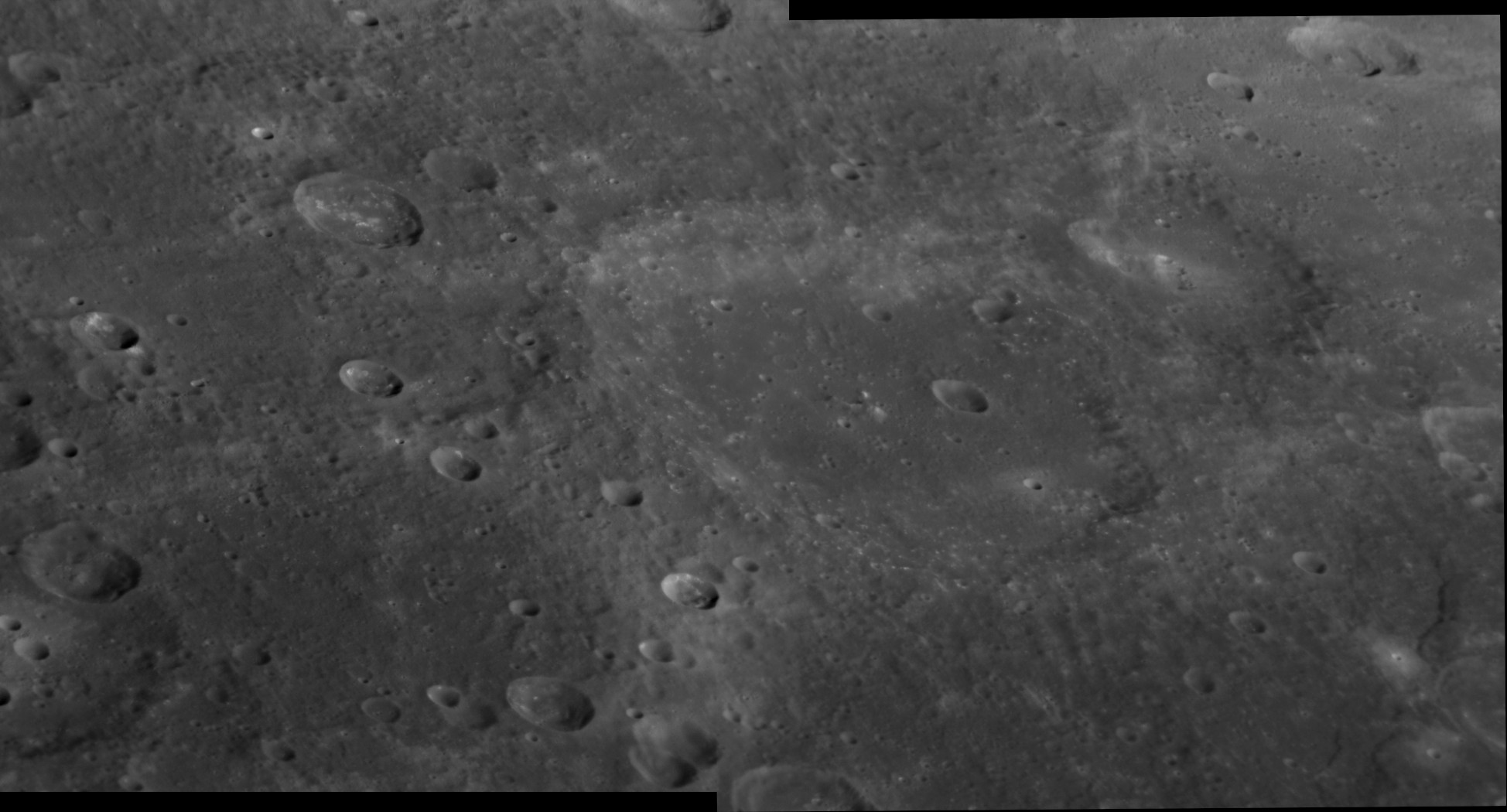
Derzhavin and Enheduanna craters from MESSENGER's second flyby of Mercury in October 2008.

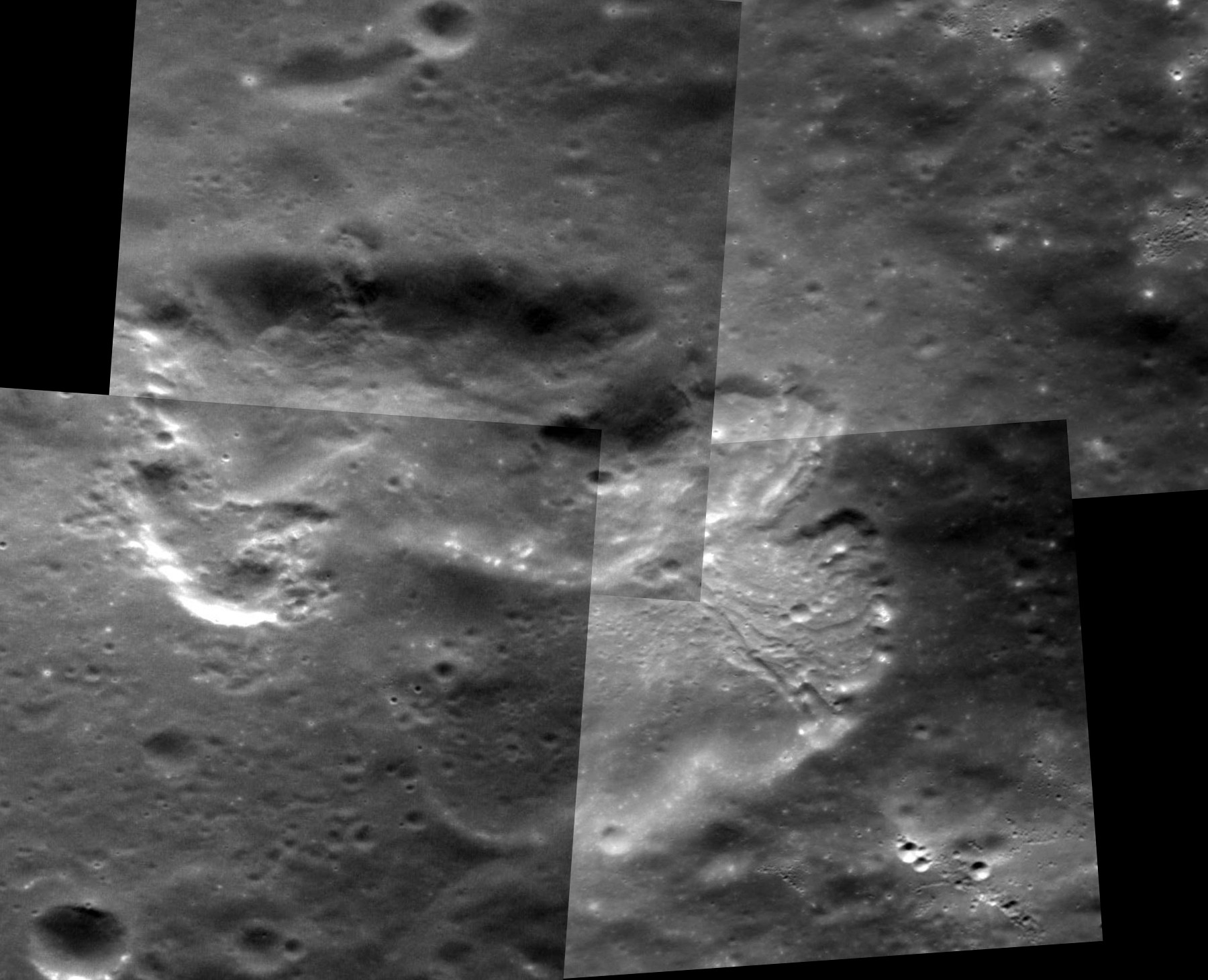
Oblique view of the depression in Enheduanna crater facing south
