= Kulthum (crater) =

Crater on Mercury

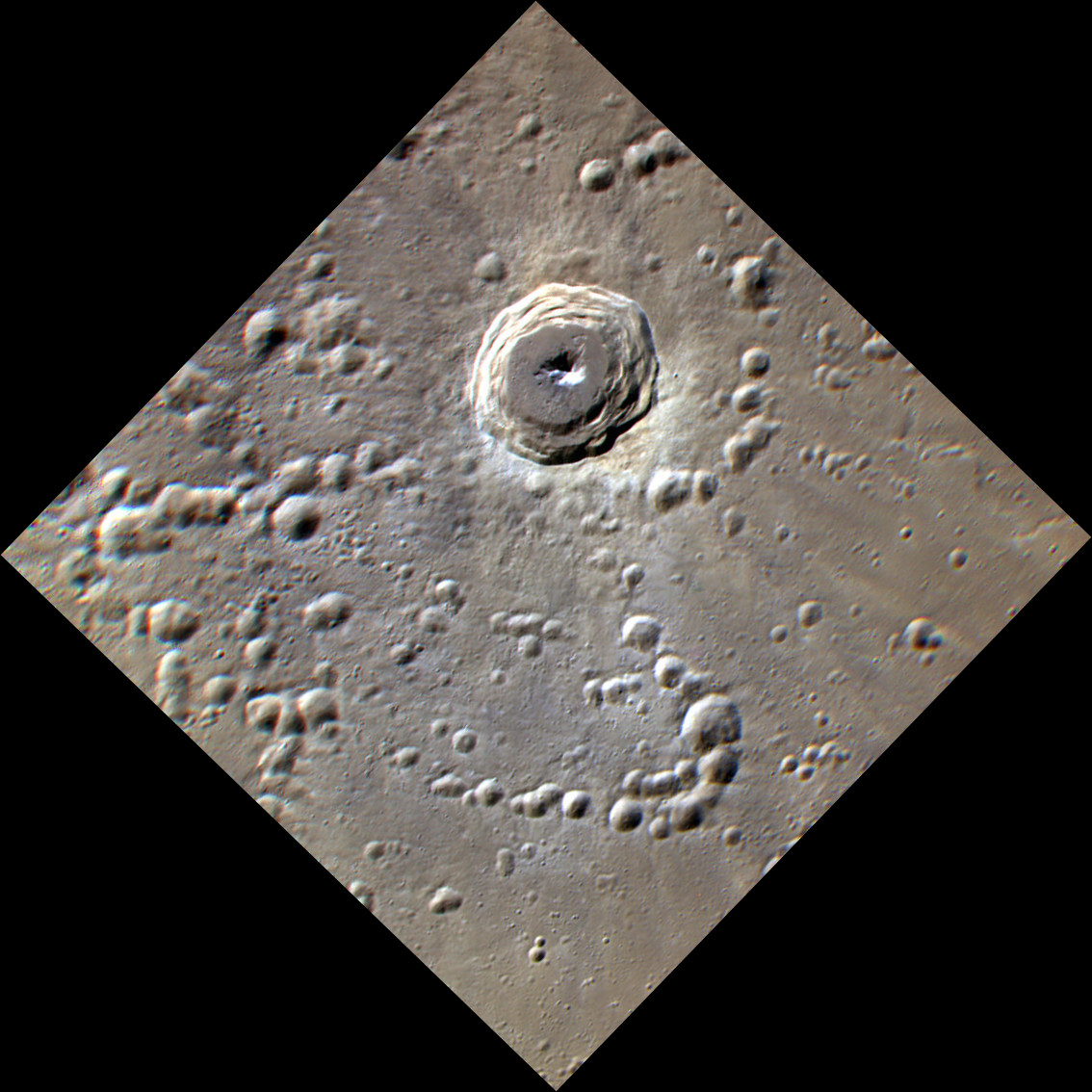
- Approximate color image of Kulthum by MESSENGER
- Feature type: Central-peak impact crater
- Location: Raditladi quadrangle, Mercury
- Coordinates: 50.72°N 93.53°E
- Diameter: 31 km (19 mi)
- Eponym: Umm Kulthum

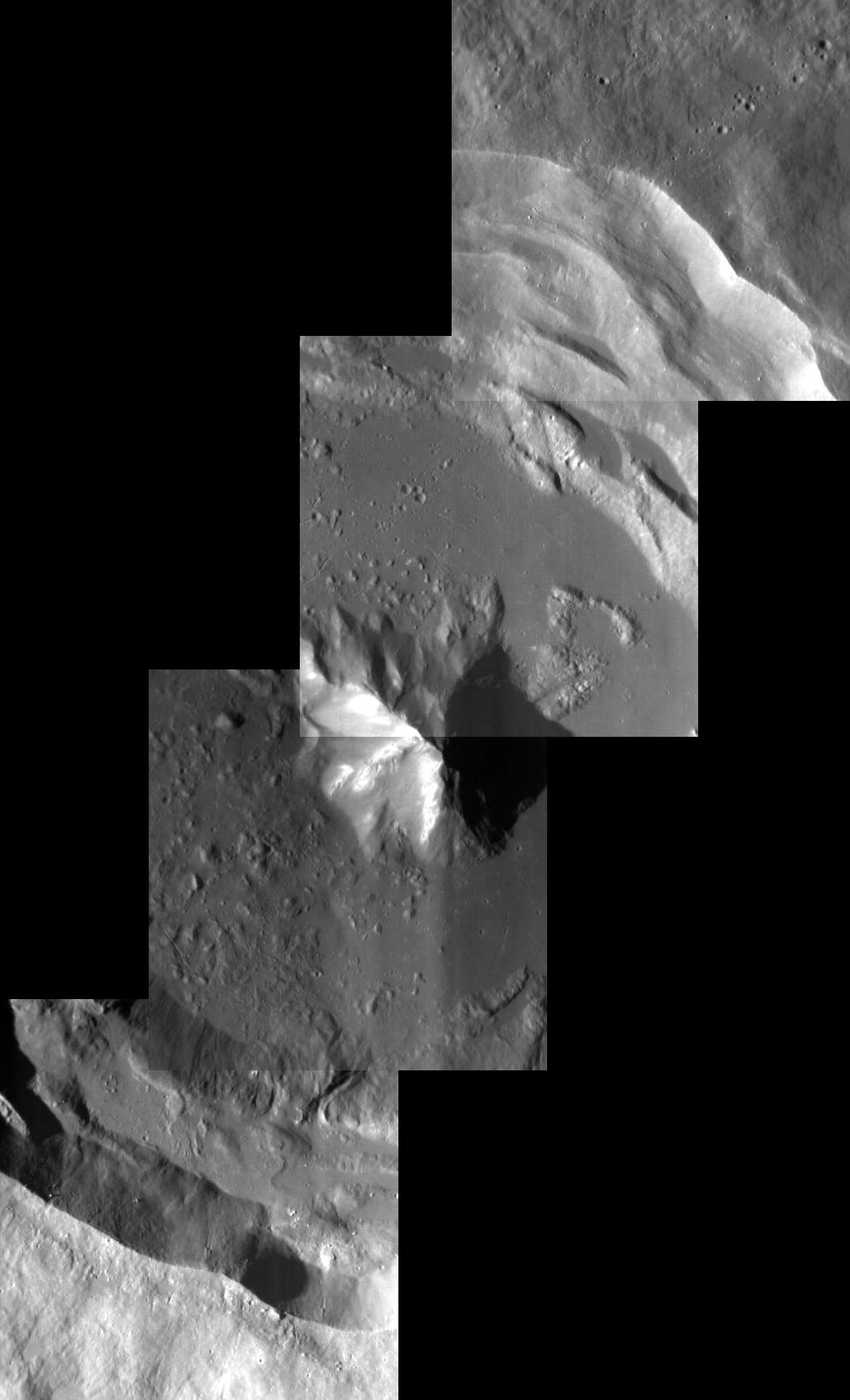
Mosaic of four MESSENGER NAC images showing the central crater

Kulthum is a crater on Mercury. It has a diameter of 31 kilometers. Its name was suggested by Molouk Ba-Isa from Saudi Arabia, Swiss individual Riana Rakotoarimanana, and American residents Yehya Hassouna, David Suttles, Thorayya Said Giovannelli and Matt Giovannelli in a naming contest which was eventually adopted by the International Astronomical Union (IAU) on 30 April 2015. Kulthum is named for the Egyptian singer Umm Kulthum.

Hollows are present as bright areas on the central peak of Kulthum.

The craters Carolan, Enheduanna, Karsh, and Rivera were also named as part of the contest.

Kulthum is east of Rustaveli crater.
