= Génia =

Génia (stylized as GéNIA; born in Ukrainian SSR) is a London-based concert pianist and composer. Génia was born in Ukraine into the Horowitz family of musicians and scientists. Her repertoire ranges from classical music to contemporary works and her own compositions.

== Education ==
Génia started her studies at the age of four with her great-grandmother, the pianist and pedagogue Regina Horowitz (sister of pianist Vladimir Horowitz and wife of the Soviet economist Evsei Liberman). Génia continued her studies with pianist and teacher Sergei Yushkevitch at the Kharkov Institute of Arts.

In 1999, Génia graduated from Guildhall School of Music earning the Premier Prix. She graduated from Trinity College of Music in 2000, studying with Professor Joan Havill and Douglas Finch where she was runner-up in the TCM Associate Soloist Competition and awarded the Founders Prize for Excellence. She was awarded the Silver Medal Award from the Worshipful Company of Musicians and the Dame Myra Hess Award.

== Career ==
She was selected as an artist for the Park Lane Young Artist Series, making her London debut in 1998 where she was described by The Times as "an outstanding musician". She later went on to tour the UK, Europe, and the United States performing with the Symphony Orchestra of the National Philharmonic Society of Ukraine and Cyprus State Orchestra and playing at the Windsor Festival.

Génia has toured the UK, Europe, and the United States. Her London appearances include Wigmore Hall, Barbican Centre, South Bank Centre, St Martin-in-the-Fields, Olympia London and Cargo. She appeared as a soloist on the soundtracks for the films Bookcruncher and Paradise Grove. Her recordings and interviews have also featured in various broadcasts on BBC Radio 1, 3, 4, 5 and BBC 4 Proms. She received critical acclaim for her live performances and contemporary classical releases for Black Box and Nonclassical.

Génia undertakes educational work and holds workshops and master-classes, lectures and individual tuition. She has taught at Trinity College of Music, Dartington International Summer School and COMA Summer Schools, De Montfort University and Lewis University and CAPMT (USA).

In 2007, Génia created Piano-Yoga, a multi-dimensional method of piano playing, performing and teaching which provides a holistic approach towards playing the piano. Her book on Piano-Yoga, Transform Your Hands, was self-published in 2009. She teaches in central London, and hosts courses and retreats worldwide. In 2012, Génia had a series of 6 Piano-Yoga lessons broadcast live on BBC Radio London 94.9 on Jo Good's show. She has been a regular guest on Jo Good's show. In 2013 she hosted a series of Piano-Yoga certificate courses at King's Place in London.

In 2014, Génia released two volumes of her own piano compositions: 'Dreams of Today, Thoughts of Tomorrow' which has been played on BBC Radio and at venues such as The Hurlingham Club London, Theatre de la Photographie et L'Image Nice and Kings Place London. Génia's compositions are regularly played on Classic FM.

GeNIA has a long term relationship with Caffè Nero, since being nominated as a featured classical artist and her music plays regularly in all their branches worldwide. She was also the first classical pianist to perform at Heathrow Terminal 2 in conjunction with Caffè Nero In December 2014.

In 2017, Génia made her debut as a voice over artist as well as appearing as a pianist in the short film '22:22' directed by Charlotte Ginsborg.

In 2019 GéNIA released 2 albums. One on her own label, GéNIA MUSIC, titled ‘Babylon’, and 'Memory Waves', released under Chapel Music and recorded for Universal Production Music UK. GéNIA’s music has appeared in the BBC America TV Show Killing Eve, British ITV series Cold Feet and ITV series Sticks and Stones.

In 2021 GéNIA started recording and producing her music, releasing 2 singles, Mon Amour (Home Version) and Vicious Circle, followed by the release of her album 'Voyages français' in 2022, which debuted GéNIA as a producer.

In 2022 GéNIA founded the charity 'Support Kharkiv Foundation'. The charity was set up to support the Ukrainian city of Kharkiv, its surrounding regions and its citizens, as the city has undergone destruction on a huge scale during the Russian invasion. In September 2022 GéNIA organised a fundraising gala concert in London at The Other Palace, where Ukrainian musicians were joined by actors Bill Nighy and Chiwetel Ejiofor. The proceeds from the concert were sent to the Support Kharkiv Foundation to help children from Kharkiv and its surrounding regions.

== Music ==
In September 2010, Génia featured on "Piano Book No.1" - a suite of piano pieces composed by Gabriel Prokofiev released by Nonclassical and distributed by Naxos in America.

'Suite For Piano And Electronics', Génia/John Richards, was released in 2007 on the Nonclassical label. It featured re-mixes by dance producers The EarlyMan, Max de Wardener, kREEPA, Gabriel Prokofiev, Derailer, Trevor Goodchilde, Germ and Vex'd.

In 1999 she released 'Transformations' with the Russian violinist Roman Mints.

In 2000 she released 'GéNIA: Unveiled' interpreting the works of 4 Russian women composers spanning 4 generations: Sofia Gubaidulina, Galina Ustvolskaya, Elena Firsova, and Lena Langer.

In 2014 she released two volumes of her own compositions named 'Dreams of Today, Thoughts of Tomorrow'.

In 2019 she released 'Babylon', an album of her own compositions.

In 2019 she released 'Memory Waves' an album of solo piano music released under Chapel Music and recorded for Universal Production Music UK.

In 2022 she released 'Voyages français' an album of her own compositions inspired by her frequent journeys to France.

In 2024 she released 'Night Sky'.

In 2026 she released the albums 'Twinkling Pathway' and 'Veiled Memory'.

== Collaborations ==
Génia commissions works particularly developing the repertoire for piano and electronics, and collaborated with an eclectic range of artists and composers including Patrick Nunn, Nik Bärtsch, John Richards (musician), Gabriel Prokofiev, Karen Tanaka.

In 2003, Génia was involved in Contemporary Infrasonic at the Southbank Centre, an experimental project into the effect of infrasound (ultra-low-frequency at or below the bottom of the frequency range audible to the human ear) using a grand piano.

In 2018 GéNIA collaborated with the group VOID, who recorded an electronic version of her piece Aphrodite, which was released on her label.

In 2022 GéNIA collaborated with the Italian composer, Paolo Cognetti by releasing his piano solo arrangement of the famous Italian folk song 'Bella Ciao'. All the proceeds from this song, the artists are sending to 'Support Kharkiv Foundation' to help the children of Kharkiv and its regions.

In 2022 GéNIA collaborated with electronic musician Bradley Russeau premiering at The Other Palace in London, their joint composition dedicated to Kharkiv and its citizens.

== Discography ==
- Piano Book No.1, GeNIA/Gabriel Prokofiev, released on CD, Nonclassical (America), 2009
- Suite For Piano And Electronics, GéNIA/John Richards, released on CD, Nonclassical, 2007
- Suite For Piano And Electronics, GéNIA/John Richards, released on Vinyl, Nonclassical, 2007
- GéNIA: Unveiled - Music from Russia's Women Composers, Black Box, 2000
- Transformations - 20th Century works for violin and piano, Roman Mints - violin, GéNIA - Piano, Black Box, 1999
- Dreams of Today, Thoughts of Tomorrow Volume I, GéNIA, released on CD and digitally 2014 (composed and performed by GéNIA)
- Dreams of Today, Thoughts of Tomorrow Volume II, GéNIA, released on CD and digitally 2014 (composed and performed by GéNIA)
- Remixes and Originals, Various Artists featuring GéNIA, released on Vinyl and digitally, Nonclassical, 2014
- The Art of Remix, Various Artists featuring GéNIA, released on Vinyl and digitally, Nonclassical, 2015
- Nonclassical 001-020, Various Artists featuring GéNIA, released digitally, Nonclassical, 2016
- Someone Like You (Piano Version), originally by Adele, released on CD and digitally 2016 (arranged and performed by GéNIA)
- Babylon, Single, GéNIA, released digitally 2017 (composed and performed by GéNIA)
- Aphrodite (Redux), Single, GéNIA released digitally 2018 (remixed by VOID)
- Aphrodite, Single, piano solo, GéNIA, released digitally 2018 (composed and performed by GéNIA)
- Aphrodite (Remix), GéNIA, released digitally 2018 (remixed by Nigel Heath)
- Babylon (Piano Solo Album), GéNIA, released digitally 2019 (composed and performed by GéNIA)
- Memory Waves (Piano Solo Album), GéNIA, released digitally 2019 (composed and performed by GéNIA)
- Mon Amour (Home Version) (Single), GéNIA, released digitally 2021 (composed, performed and produced by GéNIA)
- Vicious Circle (Single), GéNIA, released digitally 2021 (composed, performed and produced by GéNIA)
- Claude (Single), GéNIA, released digitally 2021 (composed, performed and produced by GéNIA)
- Jean (Single), GéNIA, released digitally 2021 (composed, performed and produced by GéNIA)
- St Paul (Single), GéNIA, released digitally 2021 (composed, performed and produced by GéNIA)
- St Michelle (Single), GéNIA, released digitally 2021 (composed, performed and produced by GéNIA)
- Lever du Soleil (Single), GéNIA, released digitally 2021 (composed, performed and produced by GéNIA)
- Whisper (Single), GéNIA, released digitally 2021 (composed, performed and produced by GéNIA)
- Valse à la française (Single), GéNIA, released digitally 2021 (composed, performed and produced by GéNIA)
- Where Am I? (Single), GéNIA, released digitally 2022 (composed, performed and produced by GéNIA)
- Landscapes of the Mind (Single), GéNIA, released digitally 2022 (composed, performed and produced by GéNIA)
- Voyages français (Album), GéNIA, released on CD and digitally 2022 (composed, performed and produced by GéNIA)
- Bella Ciao (Single), GéNIA & Paolo Cognetti, released digitally 2022 (performed and produced by GéNIA)
- Viva La Vida (Single), GéNIA, released digitally 2022 (performed and produced by GéNIA)
- Falling Stars (Album), GéNIA, released digitally 2024 (performed and produced by GéNIA)
- Clouds (Album), GéNIA, released digitally 2024 (performed and produced by GéNIA)
- Contemplation' (Album) GéNIA, released digitally 2024 (performed and produced by GéNIA)
- Night Sky (Album) GéNIA, released digitally 2024 (performed and produced by GéNIA)

== Multimedia ==
- Audio: A collection of interviews with Genia.
- Audio: BBC artist profile page
