= Derzhavin (crater) =

Crater on Mercury

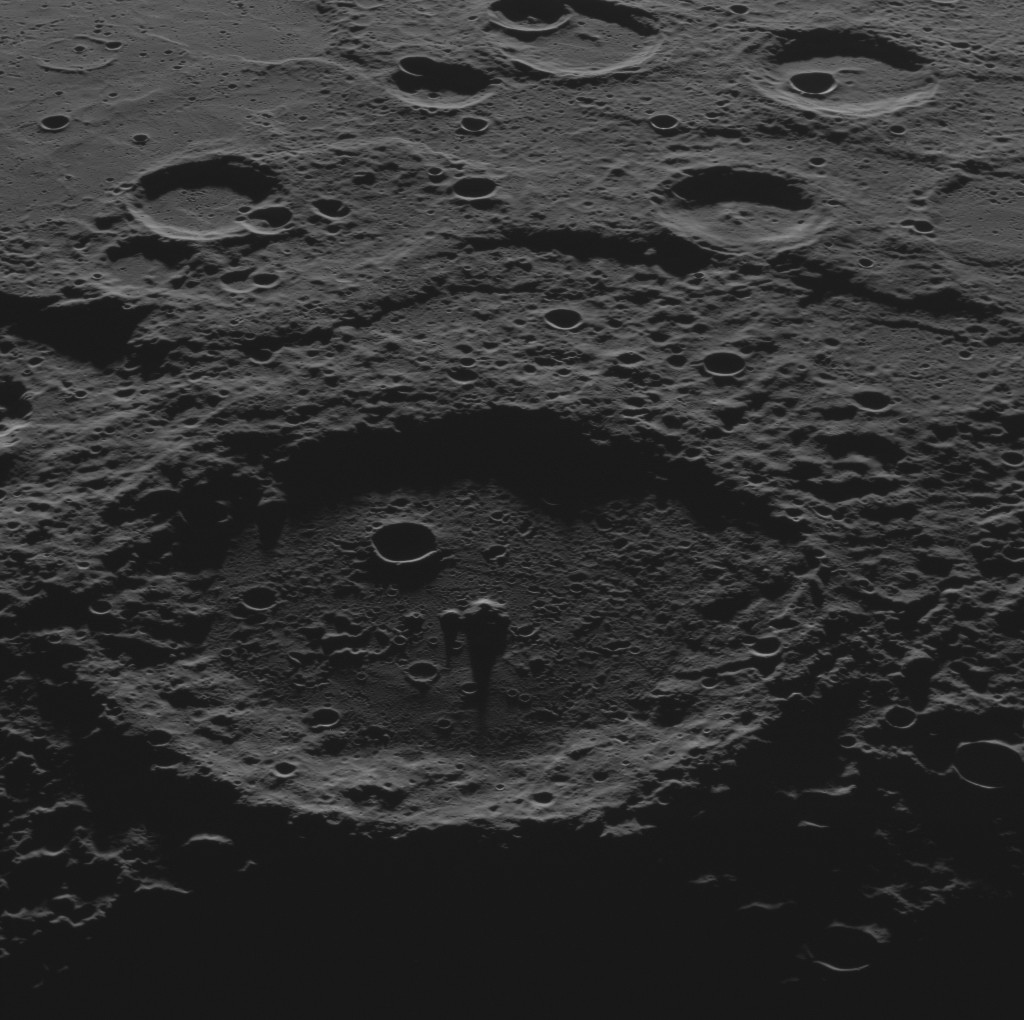
- Oblique MESSENGER WAC image of Derzhavin
- Feature type: Impact crater
- Location: Victoria quadrangle, Mercury
- Coordinates: 45.60°N 36.93°W
- Diameter: 156 km (97 mi)
- Eponym: Gavrila Derzhavin

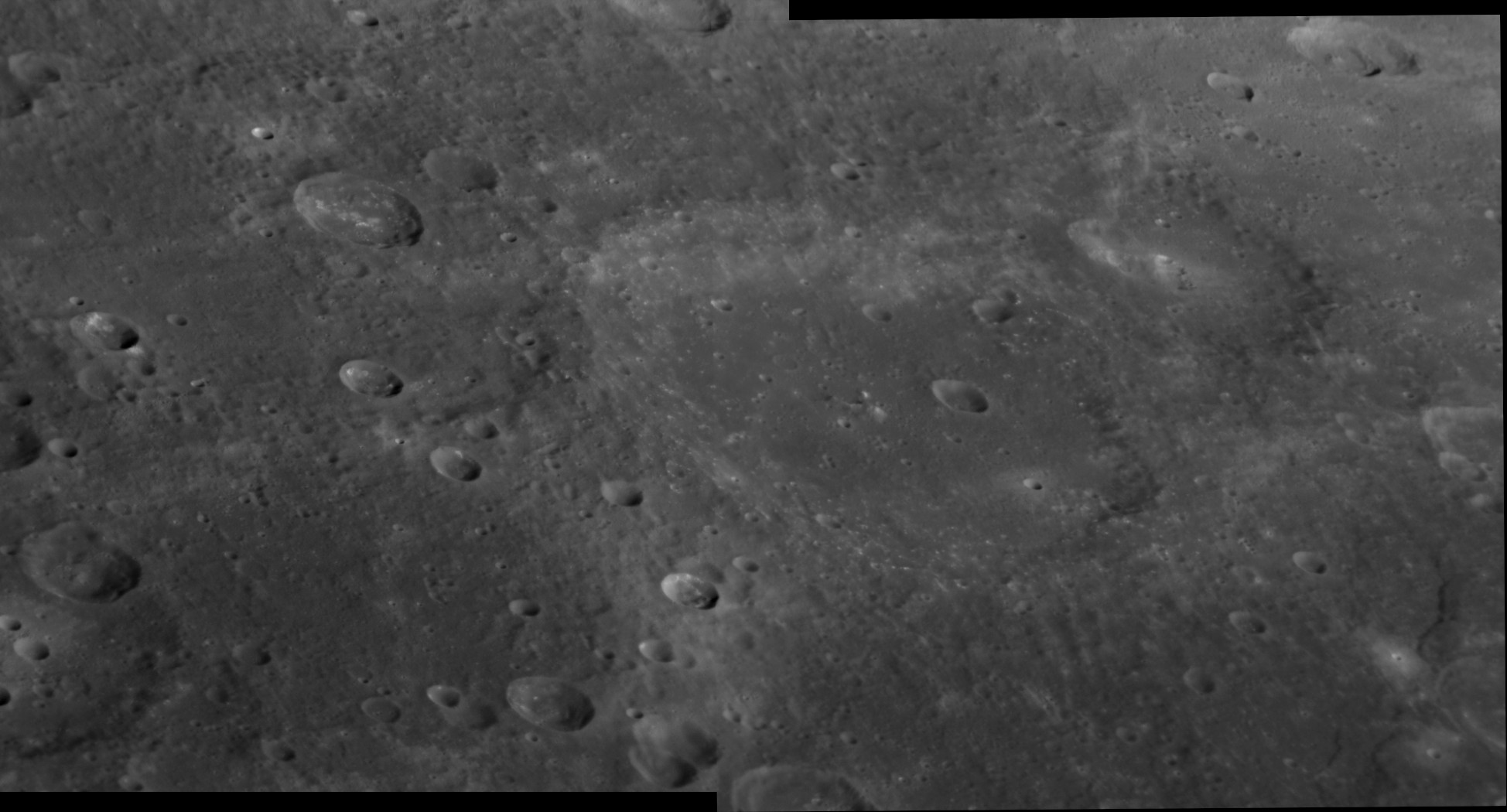
Derzhavin and Enheduanna craters from MESSENGER's second flyby of Mercury in October 2008.

Derzhavin is a crater on Mercury. It has a diameter of 156 kilometers. Its name was adopted by the International Astronomical Union in 1979. Derzhavin is named for the Russian poet Gavril Derzhavin, who lived from 1743 to 1816. The crater was first imaged by Mariner 10 in 1974.

== Hollows ==
Hollows are present on the west side of Derzhavin crater.

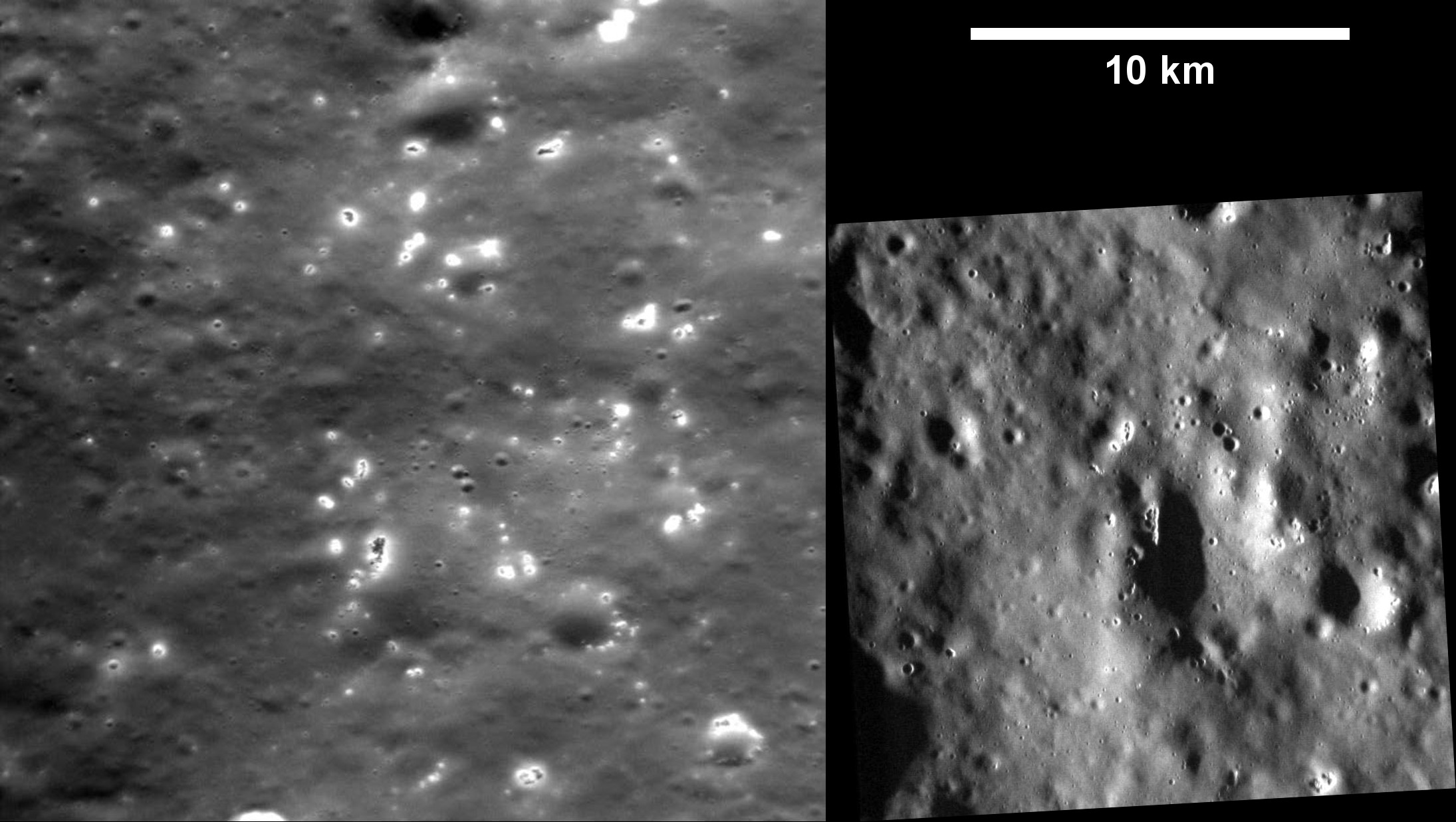
Hollows within western Derzhavin crater, shown at two different angles of illumination
