= Nonclassical =

British independent record label and night club

- Founded: 2004; 21 years ago
- Founder: Gabriel Prokofiev
- Distributor(s): Cargo Records
- Genre: Contemporary classical music
- Country of origin: United Kingdom
- Location: London
- Official website: www.nonclassical.co.uk

Nonclassical is a British independent record label and night club founded in 2004 by Gabriel Prokofiev, grandson of Sergei Prokofiev.

== History ==
Nonclassical has released fourteen albums, each following a concept of recording new contemporary classical music and then inviting a selection of musicians and producers from various genres to remix it. Artists such as Thom Yorke (Radiohead), Hot Chip, Vex'd, Max de Wardener, Simon Tong (Gorillaz and The Verve), KREEPA, Dominic Murcott, John Maclean (The Beta Band & The Aliens), Mira Calix, DJ Spooky, Tim Exile, and Gabriel Prokofiev have done remixes for the label.

On October 26th 2024, Nonclassical celebrated their twentieth anniversary with a concert featuring the London Symphony Orchestra. The concert featured premieres by Emily Abdy, Darren Bloom, Tonia Ko and Beatrice Dillon.

== Nonclassical club nights ==
Nonclassical hosts regular live music nights to promote a new alternative classical music scene in London. The nights have been held at a number of East London venues, including Bloc (Hackney Wick), The Shacklewell Arms, Red Gallery, Cargo, the Horse and Groom, The Macbeth, XOYO, and Kings Place.

The events present live contemporary classical music in 'gig' or 'club' settings, alongside DJs playing a mixture of modern composition, electronic dance music. Representative artists featured in DJ sets include Tansy Davies, Raymond Scott, Errorsmith, Stockhausen, Alarm Will Sound, Edgard Varèse.

In 2012, Nonclassical began hosting larger scale events at London's XOYO nightclub. These have featured high profile DJs and producers such as Juan Atkins, Nathan Fake, Optimo and Alex Smoke, and large live ensembles including a 52-piece string orchestra.

In 2020 James McIlwrath won the Nonclassical ‘Battle of the Bands’ competition with performances of Alison Knowles’ ‘Shuffle piece’, Neil Luck’s ‘THING’, and Oogoo Maia’s ‘Sisyphus at Work’.

== Releases ==
Released	Artist	Album	Notes
August 2004	The Elysian Quartet	Gabriel Prokofiev String Quartet No.1	
November 2006	GeNIA	John Richards Suite for Piano & Electronics	
July 2007	The Elysian Quartet	Gabriel Prokofiev String Quartet No.2	
July 2008	John Matthias & Nick Ryan	Cortical Songs	
November 2009	The Heritage Orchestra feat. DJ Yoda	G Prokofiev 'Concerto for Turntables & Orchestra'	
2010	Gabriel Prokofiev	Piano Book no. 1	Performed by GeNIA
2010	Powerplant	G Prokofiev 'Import/Export: Suite For Global Junk'	
2010	The Mercury Quartet	Mercury Acoustic	
February 2011	Consortium5	Tangled Pipes	
March 2011	Nonclassical	Remixes & Originals Vol. 1	
April 2011	Tansy Davies	Troubairitz	
May 2011	Juice Vocal Ensemble	Songspin	
October 2011	Aisha Orazbayeva	Outside	
May 2012	Gabriel Prokofiev + Peter Gregson	Cello Multitracks	
September 2014	Consortium5	Consortium5 Tangled Pipes	
September 2014	The Mercury Quartet	Mercury Acoustic	
September 2014	Nonclassical	Remixes and Originals Vol #1	
September 2014	Nonclassical	Cortical Songs	
September 2014	Gabriel Prokofiev	Gabriel Prokofiev Concerto for Turntables and Orchestra	
September 2014	Gabriel Prokofiev	Import/Export - Suite for Global Junk	
September 2014	The Elysian Quartet	Gabriel Prokofiev: String Quartet n.1	
September 2014	GéNIA	John Richards Suites for Piano and Electronics	
September 2014	The Elysian Quartet	Gabriel Prokofiev: String Quartet n.2	
September 2014	Aisha Orazbayeva	Outside	
September 2014	Tansy Davies	Troubairitz	
September 2014	Gabriel Prokofiev + Peter Gregson	Float Dance EP1	
September 2014	GéNIA	Gabriel Prokofiev: Piano Book n.1	
September 2014	House of Bedlam	Talking Microtonal Blues	
September 2014	Gabriel Prokofiev + Peter Gregson	Cello Multitracks	
September 2014	Gabriel Prokofiev	Gabriel Prokofiev Selected Classical Works 2003-2012	
September 2014	Juice Vocal Ensemble	Laid Bare: Love Songs	
October 2014	Gabriel Prokofiev	The Art of Remix	
November 2014	Gabriel Prokofiev	Float Dance EP2	
December 2014	Juice Vocal Ensemble (Arr.MaJiKer)	Only Girl in the World	
June 2015	Klavikon	Klavikon	
October 2015		The art of remix EP #1	
July 2015		Live @ Nonclassical Vol. #1	
January 2016	Nick Luscombe	Nonclassical 001-002	
March 2017		Outside the Lines - Vol.1	
November 2017	Langham Research Centre	Tape Works Vol. 1	
July 2018	Tom Richards	Pink Nothing	
