= Karsh (crater) =

Crater on Mercury

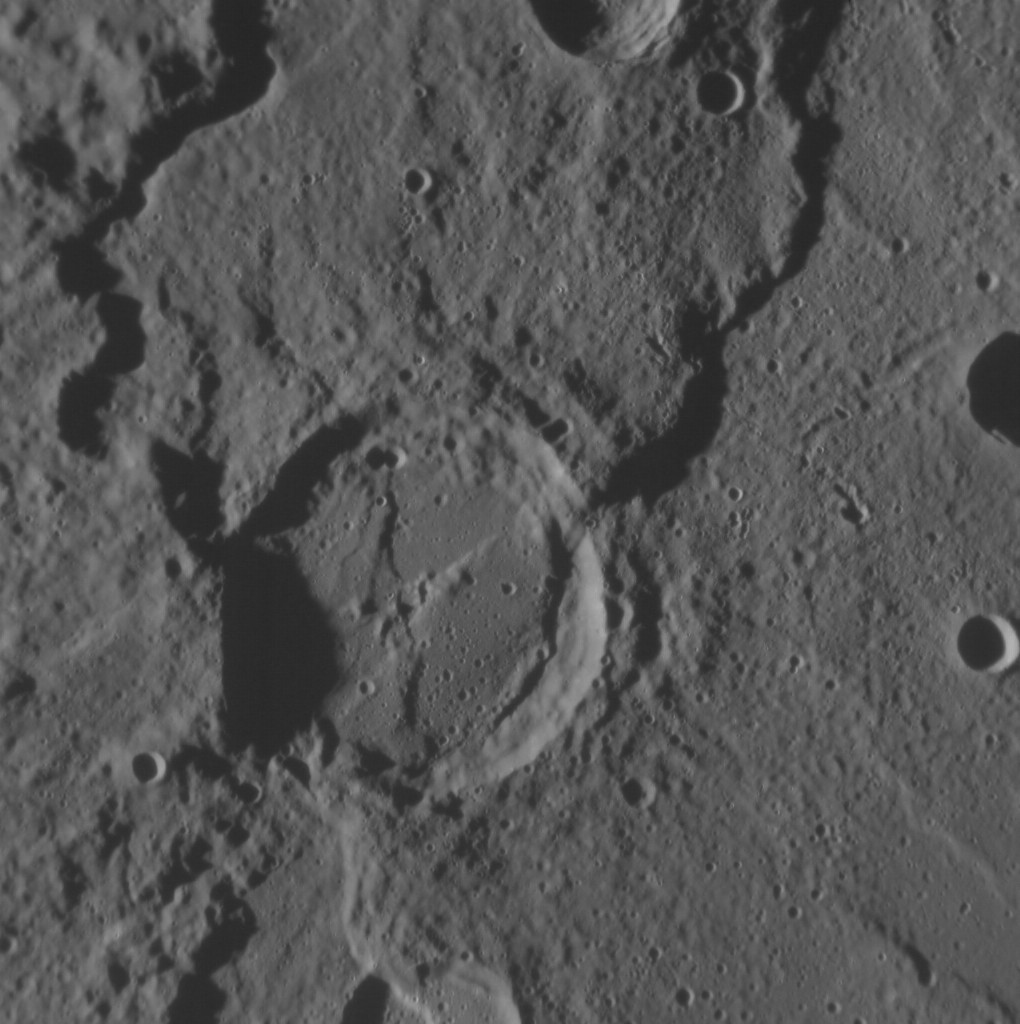
- MESSENGER NAC image of Karsh
- Feature type: Impact crater
- Location: Debussy quadrangle, Mercury
- Coordinates: 35.49°S 78.85°E
- Diameter: 58 km (36 mi)
- Eponym: Yousuf Karsh

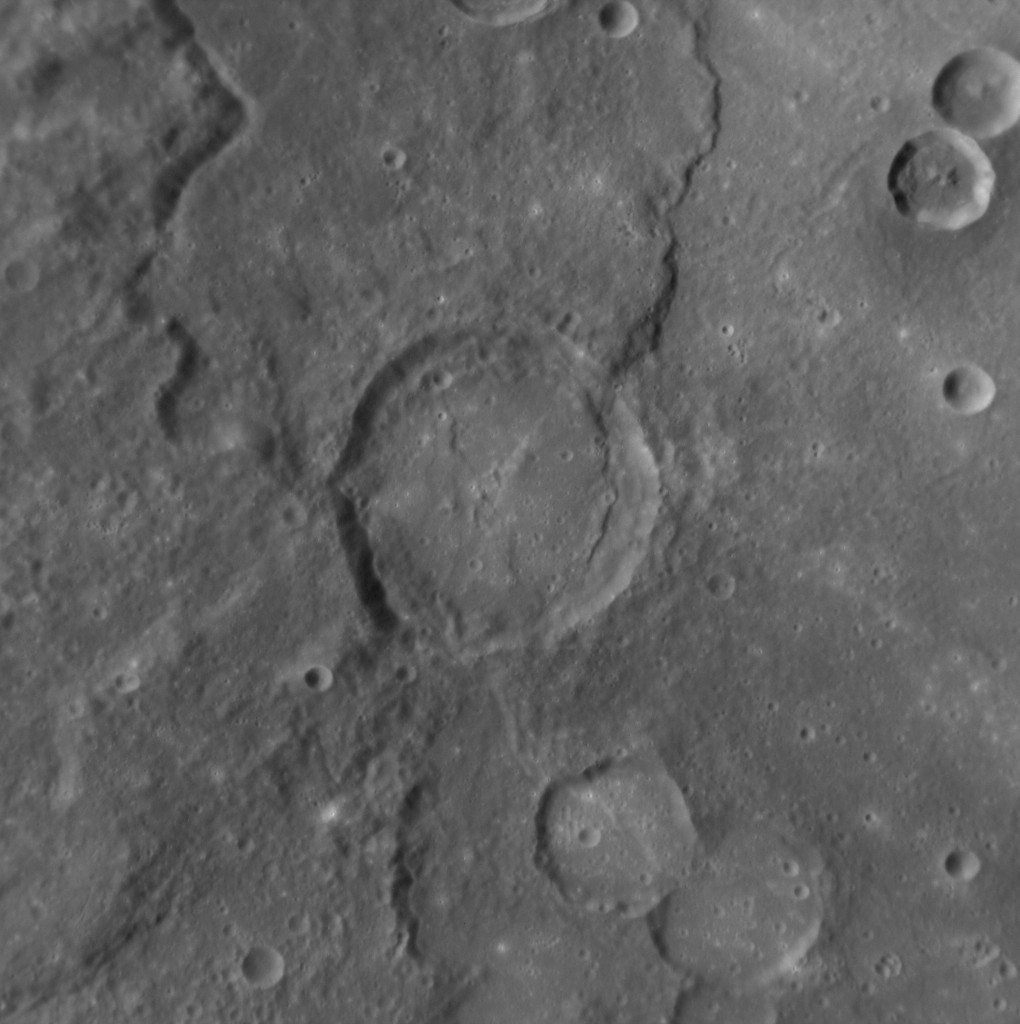
Another MESSENGER image

Karsh is a crater on Mercury. It has a diameter of 58 kilometers. Its name was suggested by American resident Elizabeth Freeman Rosenzweig in a naming contest which was eventually adopted by the International Astronomical Union (IAU) on 30 April 2015. Karsh is named for the Armenian-Canadian photographer Yousuf Karsh. The craters Carolan, Enheduanna, Kulthum, and Rivera were also named as part of the contest.

Karsh lies on the west rim of the much larger Rembrandt basin.
