= Rivera (crater) =

Crater on Mercury

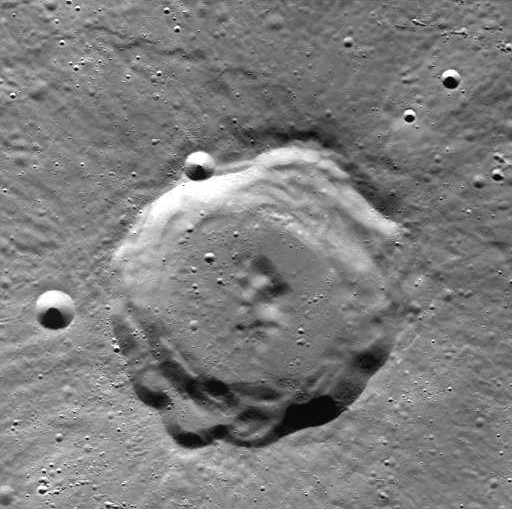
- MESSENGER WAC image
- Feature type: Impact crater
- Location: Borealis quadrangle, Mercury
- Coordinates: 69.29°N 32.18°E
- Diameter: 40 km (25 mi)
- Eponym: Diego Rivera

Rivera is a crater on Mercury. It has a diameter of 40 kilometers. Its name was suggested by Mexican residents Ricardo Martinez and Arturo Gutierrez, and American residents Rebecca Hare and José Martinez, in a naming contest which was eventually adopted by the International Astronomical Union (IAU) on 30 April 2015. Rivera is named for the Mexican poet Diego Rivera. The craters Carolan, Enheduanna, Karsh, and Kulthum were also named as part of the contest.

Rivera lies within the vast plain of Borealis Planitia.
