= Oleg Prokofiev =

Russian painter

Oleg Sergeyevich Prokofiev (Russian: Оле́г Серге́евич Проко́фьев; 14 December 1928 – 20 August 1998) was an artist, sculptor and poet, and the son of composer Sergei Prokofiev.

== Artistic life ==
His career as an artist began at sixteen, attending the Moscow School of Art from 1944 to 1949. On completing his studies, Prokofiev worked in the studio of the painter Robert Falk, leaving in 1952 to work for the Institute of Art History in Moscow. There he studied and published his writing, specializing in the ancient arts of India and South-East Asia. As the second son of Sergei Prokofiev, he wrote that his father's music inspired in him 'a wave of some wonderful energy...a poetic or artistic impulse'.

During Prokofiev's lifetime he exhibited worldwide, including the UK, Germany, Russia, France, and the US. As an artist, he was both excited about the future of art as well as informed about its history. During a visit to New York City in 1977, Prokofiev experienced the works of Mark Rothko, Clyfford Still, Robert Motherwell, Barnett Newman, and Helen Frankenthaler, and these continued to influence his own work throughout the 1980s. He began creating organic constructivist sculptures, and over a short period of time his paintings also began to change. His brightly saturated line paintings and skyline sculptures of the 1980s demonstrate a definite departure from the greys, browns, and masking white works of the 1960s and early 70s.

Since his death, his popular abstract compositions have been exhibited in the collection of the renowned Tretyakov Gallery in Moscow. His work is also in the collections of the Lehmbruck Museum of Modern Sculpture, (Germany), the Zimmerli Art Museum (US), the Leeds City Art Gallery (UK), and the MART Museum (Italy).

== Personal life ==
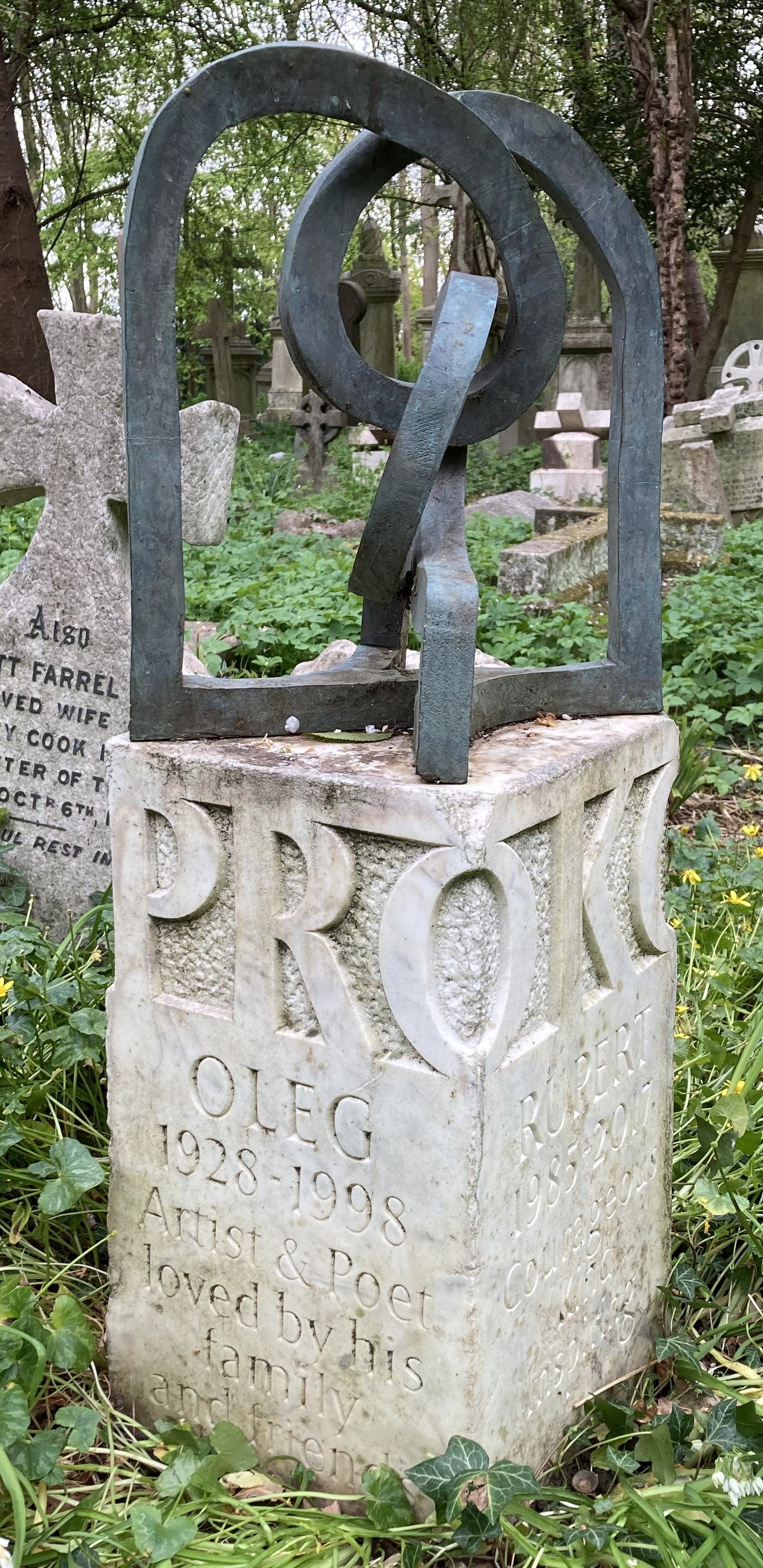
Family grave of Oleg Prokofiev in Highgate Cemetery

Born on 14 December 1928, from Sergei Prokofiev's first wife, Lina Llubera (the stage name of Carolina Codina). They lived in Paris until moving to Moscow, in 1935, at the age of seven.

Oleg was first married to Sofia Feinberg (1928–2025) with whom he had a son, Sergei O. Prokofieff (1954–2014). The son lived, from 1985, in Germany and Switzerland with his wife Astrid, and wrote profound works in the field of Anthroposophy and, in general, Christian occultism.

Oleg decided to move to the West, and from 1971 until his death he lived in Blackheath, London. Oleg married Frances who gave him five children, one of whom, Quentin, died at an early age. Frances Prokofiev, her four children and Anastasia live in Britain. His son Gabriel Prokofiev is a London-based composer, producer and DJ. His son Rupert died in 2017 aged 31 from ataxia–telangiectasia.

Oleg Prokofiev died in 1998 aged 69, while on holiday on the island of Alderney in the English Channel and is buried on the west side of Highgate Cemetery.

== Selected exhibitions ==
- 2014 – 'From East to West' at Hill Gallery, London
- 1999 – DeliArt, London
- 1997 – Museum of Music, Moscow
- 1994 – Contemporary, London
- 1993 – W. Lehmbruck Museum of Modern Sculpture, Germany
- 1991 – Lemington Spa Art Gallery and Museum; Malvern Winter Gardens
- 1989 – Sue Rankin Gallery, London; La Mama Galleria, New York City
- 1988 – Burg Zweiffel, (Germany); '100 Years of British Art' at Leeds City Art Gallery
- 1987 – Dortmund Opera House and Matthew Scott Gallery, Miami
- 1985 – Woodlands Art Gallery, London
- 1984–1985 – Galerie 'Edition de Beauclair', Munich; and Theater am Gartnerplatz, Munich
- 1984 – Old Vic Theatre, London; Galerie Johanna Ricard, Nuremberg
- 1983 – ACG, London
- 1981 – Galerie Mandragore, Paris
- 1980 – Galerie C. Ratie, Paris
- 1977 – Northern Artists Gallery, Harrogate
- 1976 – University of Surrey, Guildford; Sadlers Wells Theatre, London
- 1975 – Coard, Paris
- 1974 – Leeds City Art Gallery Link seems to be dead
