= Iain Chambers (musician) =

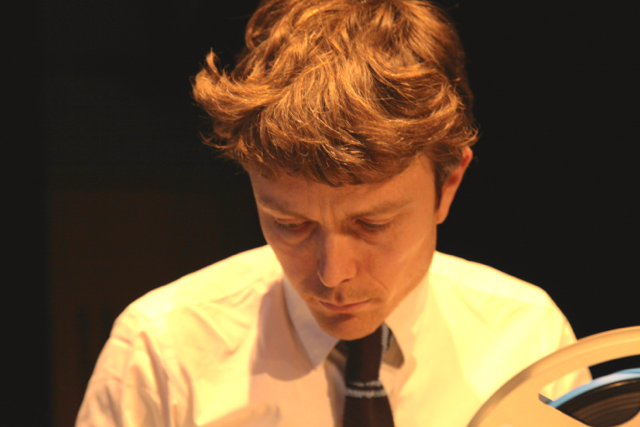
- Composer Iain Chambers performing in London, 2015

Background information
- Genres: Musique concrète, experimental
- Occupations: composer, producer and performer
- Years active: 1996–present
- Labels: Touch Music, Persistence of Sound, Flaming Pines, Econore
- Member of: Langham Research Centre
- Website: www.iainchambers.com

Iain Chambers is an English composer, producer and performer.

Iain has composed and performed since the 1990s. He formed the duo Bow Mods with Philip Clayton Smith, releasing an album and 2 EPs on Drunken Records. He produced programmes at BBC Radio 3 between 1999 and 2007, including Andy Kershaw and Late Junction. With Kershaw he made programmes in Algeria, Mali, Corsica and Sardinia, winning a Gold award for best Specialist Music Programme at the Radio Academy Awards in 2003.

In 2003, with Radio 3 colleagues Felix Carey and Philip Tagney, he co-founded musique concrète collective Langham Research Centre. The trio sought to breathe new life into experiments with reel-to-reel tape, producing two editions of Between The Ears: Gateshead Multistorey Carpark, and guest+host=ghost written by and starring Peter Blegvad, and featuring Nick Cave. In 2005 the trio were joined by Robert Worby, and began to perform new realisations of work by John Cage, Alvin Lucier, Christian Wolff and others, using their instrumentarium of obsolete analogue equipment, alongside their own new music made from the same sources.

Iain won a second Radio Academy award for his 2011 radiophonic drama written by Peter Blegvad, Use It Or Lose It. Broadcast by BBC Radio 3 and starring Harriet Walter and David Horovitch, the drama also received a Prix Europa Special Commendation, and was a finalist in the 2013 BBC Audio Drama Awards.

In 2010, Iain began making music using location recordings as compositional material. His piece The Regent's Canal – featuring pitched-down bicycle bells – was a finalist in the 2012 Europe – A Sound Panorama competition. In 2013 he was commissioned by Musicity to make a site specific composition – Operahuset – to be permanently housed on the sloping roof of Oslo Opera House.

Iain founded the media cooperative Open Audio in 2012 with Nina Perry and Vivienne Perry. The company produce multimedia content alongside dramas, documentaries and features for BBC Radio and international broadcasters.

Since 2014 Iain has led the project Recomposed, creating live recompositions of concerts in time for the audience's exit from the first show. The project has received critical acclaim for performances at Cheltenham Jazz Festival and Vossajazz

In 2015 Iain staged the first concerts ever held in Tower Bridge's bascule chamber. The huge subterranean space housed 12 sold-out concerts featuring Iain's new work Bascule Chambers, deploying the sound of Tower Bridge lifting as compositional material, alongside trumpets and trombones playing the pitches sounded by the bridge. A recording of the concert was released by Touch Music. Iain continues to curate the Bascule Chamber Concerts, now an annual event.

In 2017 Iain created a large outdoor radiophonic work, The House of Sound, for performance outside the Guildhall, London, supported by City of London Corporation, Cheapside Business Alliance, Arts Council England and the Heritage Lottery Fund. The work was also commissioned for broadcast by Westdeutscher Rundfunk, and had an accompanying sonic trail of Mythophone speakers, created by Dan Fox and Dave Young. Iain composed a new version of the House of Sound for the reopening of Reading Abbey in 2018.

In 2019 Iain launched the independent record label, Persistence of Sound, celebrating musique concrète, field recording and the interplay between these disciplines. The label's first releases included his radiophonic work, The Eccentric Press, commissioned by Westdeutscher Rundfunk in Cologne, a finalist in the EBU's Palma Ars Acustica awards. and its follow-up piece, Maudslay Engine, commissioned by Radio National in Australia.

Iain's album Secrets of Orford Ness was released by Flaming Pines in 2020.

Ivry-sur-Seine, Iain's Hörspiel for Westdeutscher Rundfunk exploring Paris's concrete architecture through sound, won the Prix Palma Ars Acustica in 2021.

== Selected compositions ==
- "The Gathering Grounds" (2021) Hörspiel
- "Concrete Paris" (2021) musique concrète
- "Ivry-sur-Seine" (2020) Hörspiel
- "The Halyards of Woodbridge" (2020) musique concrète
- "The Sound of Change" (2019) musique concrète
- "Secrets of Orford Ness" (2019) Hörspiel
- "Suite for Piano and Field Recordings" (2018) For piano solo and radiophonic sound
- "City of Women" (2018) For 4 sopranos, choir, percussionist and radiophonic sound
- "Infinity Disappears" (2018) For choir (SSATB)
- "Now Means Nothing" (2018) For choir (SSATB)
- "Sound of Changes" (2018) Radiophonic work for industrial sounds
- "The House of Sound" (2017) Radiophonic work for live musicians and surround sound loudspeaker array.
- "Arne Richards" (2017) For harpsichord and tape
- "On Imaginary Media" (2017) Radiophonic drama
- "Lewis Valentine" (2016) Radiophonic work for organ and voice
- "Maudslay Engine" (2016) Radiophonic work for industrial sounds
- "Singing Bowls" (2016) Setting of Emily Dickinson poetry for choir (SSSAATB)
- "I Started Early - Took My Dog" (2016) Setting of Emily Dickinson poetry (SATB)
- "I Became Mermaid" (2016) Setting of Emily Berry poem for mezzo-soprano and harp/piano
- "The Eccentric Press" (2016) Radiophonic work for industrial sounds
- "The Impossible Book" (2016) Radiophonic drama
- "Bascule Chambers" (2015) Radiophonic work for brass quintet, featuring the sound of Tower Bridge lifting
- "Three Poems" (2015) Radiophonic work for mezzo-soprano setting poetry by Emily Dickinson, Abraham Cowley, Harold Hart Crane
- "Hoketus Prima" (2015) Fanfare for 2 x trumpets; 2 x trombones
- "Eschatology" (2015) Radiophonic drama
- "The Regent's Canal, London" (2014) – sound art commission for Radio Australia
- "1200 feet" (2014) sound art commission for Wycombe Listening exhibition
- "The Eternal Moment" (2014) Radiophonic drama
- "Chinoiserie" (2013) Radiophonic drama
- "Operahuset" (2013) location-based audio composition
