= Prokofiev (crater) =

Crater on Mercury

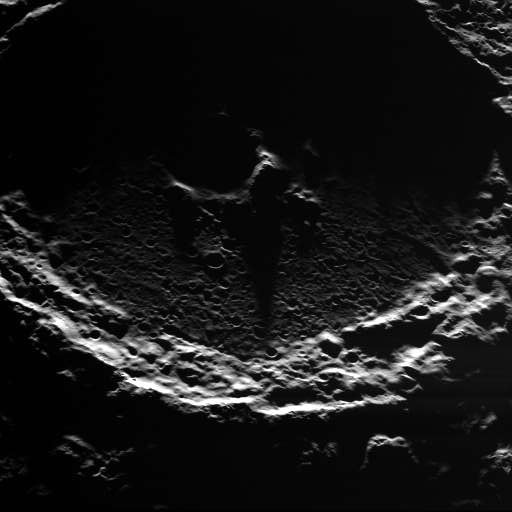
- Oblique MESSENGER image looking south
- Feature type: Central-peak impact crater
- Location: Borealis quadrangle, Mercury
- Coordinates: 86°N 296.3°W
- Diameter: 112 km
- Eponym: Sergei Prokofiev

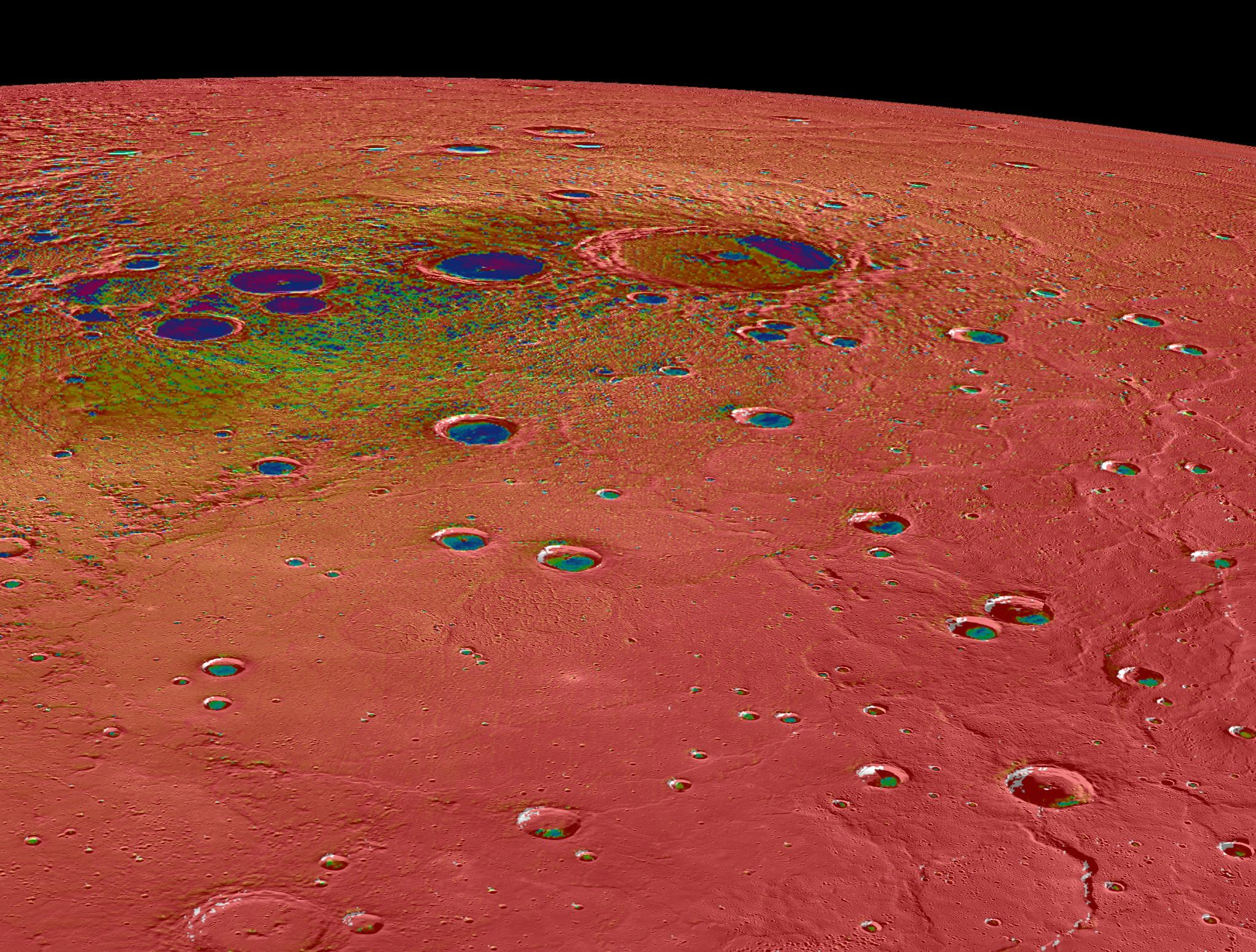
Prokofiev crater, near center. False-color image showing maximum temperatures of north polar region.

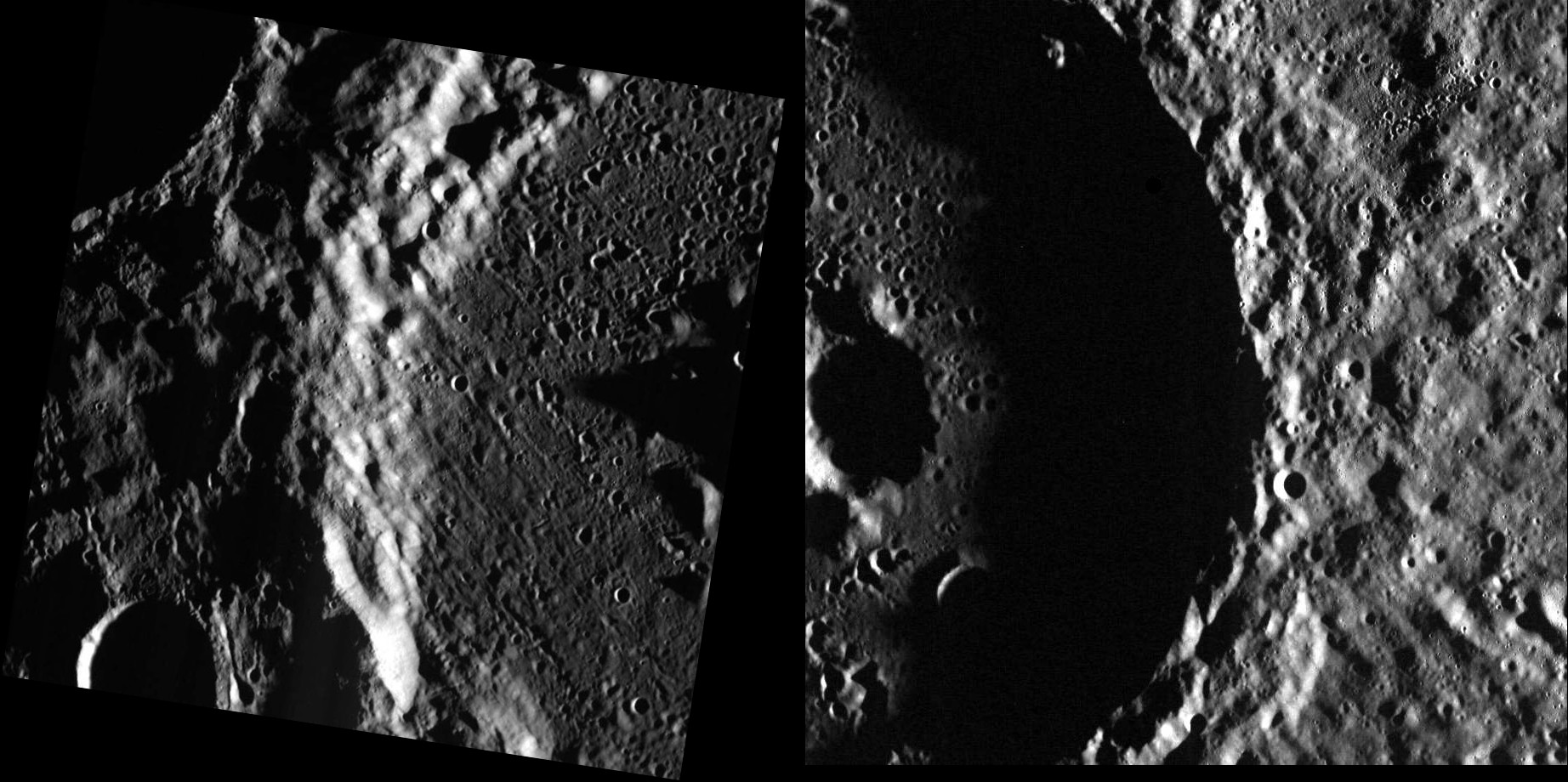
Mosaic of MESSENGER images

Prokofiev is a crater near the north pole of the planet Mercury, named after the Russian composer Sergei Prokofiev. Data from the MESSENGER spacecraft indicates that it contains water ice and organic compounds. Although other craters in Mercury's north polar region are also believed to contain ice, Prokofiev is the largest of them, with probable surface ice along the southern crater floor that is in perpetual darkness.

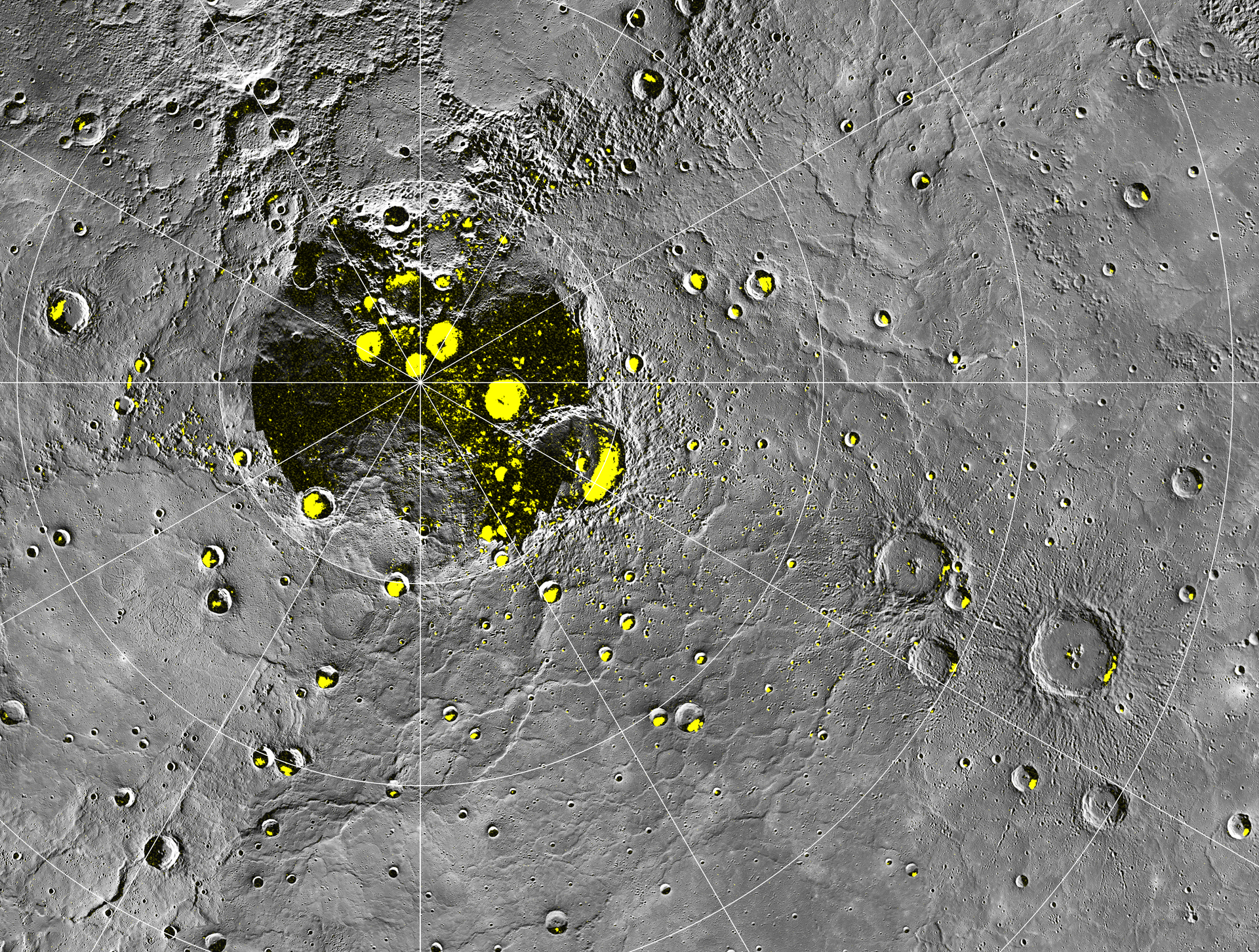
Radar-bright deposits near the north pole. Prokofiev is near center.
