= Gabriel Prokofiev =

English composer

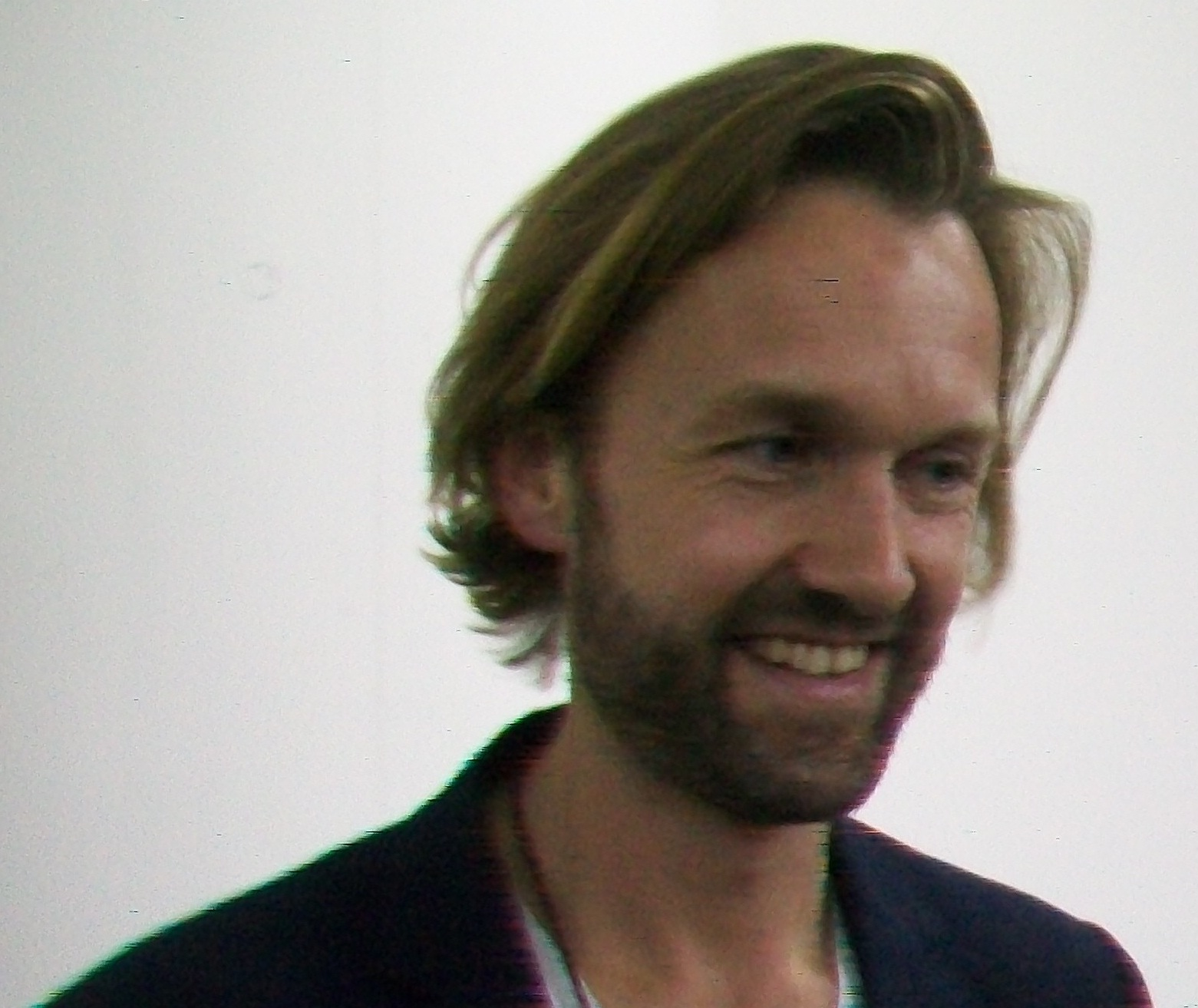
- Prokofiev in Saint Petersburg, Russia
- Born: 6 January 1975 (age 51); London, England
- Occupations: Composer, producer, DJ
- Years active: 1997—present
- Relatives: Oleg Prokofiev (father); Sergei Prokofiev (grandfather)

Gabriel Prokofiev (born 6 January 1975) is a Russo-British composer, producer, DJ, and founder of the Nonclassical record label and nightclub. He has been nominated for two Ivor Novello Awards and his works have been performed internationally by orchestras such as BBC Philharmonic, St Petersburg Philharmonic, Seattle Symphony, Detroit Symphony, MDR Leipzig, Buenos Aires Philharmonic and Royal Seville Symphony Orchestra.

== Early life ==
Gabriel Prokofiev was born in London on 6 January 1975 to an English mother and a Russian father, the artist Oleg Prokofiev, and is the grandson of the composer Sergei Prokofiev. His childhood was creative. He studied piano, horn, trumpet, and sang choral music. Resisting the pressure to embark on a classical career, he instead started writing songs and joined a pop band at age ten. Inspired by the electronic dance music of the 90s but also wanting to compose classical music, Prokofiev decided to focus on the sub-genre of electroacoustic music during his student years.

Enticed by the impressive BEAST (Birmingham Electro Acoustic Sound Theatre), founded by the renowned composer Jonty Harrison, Prokofiev studied at the University of Birmingham. He then went on to study a Masters in composition at the University of York, entering one of his compositions into the Bourges International Electro-Acoustic Music Competition. He won a place in the student residency category. He also became familiar with electronic and hip-hop production techniques and was active as a producer for several years.

== Career ==
Prokofiev returned to writing classical music in 2003 with two string quartets, written for the Elysian Quartet. He then founded the independent record label and night club Nonclassical in 2004, as a way of bringing classical music to younger people. The Nonclassical club nights in London featured experiments in performing classical or classical-influenced music in nontraditional venues. Releasing recordings of the string quartets on his label, he included remixes from electronic music producers (including Vex’d and Hot Chip). This interest in remixing classical music led to compose an "orchestral remix" of Beethoven's Symphony No. 9 in D minor, Op. 125 (2011), commissioned by the Orchestre National des Pays de la Loire, then performed to sold-out concert halls in Angers and Nantes. His first breakthrough as a classical composer came when his Concerto for Turntables and Orchestra No.1 was performed at the 2011 BBC Proms. Prokofiev wrote Concerto for Turntables and Orchestra in 2006 during a time when he was wrestling with his creative loyalties between classical and electronic music.

After the Proms, Prokofiev gradually began to dedicate himself to classical music alone, a move that was hastened by an invitation from the Orchestre de Pau Pays de Béarn (OPPB) in France to become their composer in residence. As Prokofiev's fame spread, he began to collaborate with prominent artists on both sides of the classical and pop divide. Developing his name as a composer of concerti for unconventional instruments, including works such as the Concerto for Bass Drum and Orchestra (2013), commissioned by the London Contemporary Orchestra and Princeton Symphony. Taking inspiration from his nonclassical club nights, the concerto focused on the intriguing choice of Bass drum as a solo instrument. His Violin Concerto was performed by Daniel Hope and the Borusan Istanbul Philharmonic at the BBC Proms in 2014, and his Saxophone Concerto, performed by jazz-man Branford Marsalis, was jointly commissioned by the Naples Philharmonic and the Detroit Symphony in 2017.

He has often collaborated with choreographers and ballet companies, composing a works for the Rambert Dance Company, Birmingham Royal Ballet, Katarzyna Kozielska’s Dark Glow, premiered by Stuttgart Ballet, and Bayadère: The Ninth Life, choreographed by Shobana Jeyasingh.

In 2019, after attracting the attention of Regensburg Opera, Gabriel was commissioned to write his first full length opera, ‘Elizabetta', an invigorating mix of classic operatic aria and recitative with techno and dance, TV-commercials, Congolese song, contemporary classical and electronic music.

In 2022 Prokofiev composed the soundtrack for Litvinenko, the ITVX drama about the poisoning of former Russian security officer Alexander “Sasha” Litvinenko who had defected to the UK.

== Personal life ==
Prokofiev resides in Hackney, London, with his wife and their three children.

== Selected works ==
=== Soloist and orchestra ===
- Flute Concerto (2022), commissioned for Massimo Mercelli (solo flute) by Emilia Romagna Festival
- Viola Concerto (2022), commissioned by Beethoven Orchester Bonn, BBC National Orchestra of Wales, Orchestra Sinfonica di Milano Giuseppe Verdi and Oregon Music Festival
- Saxophone Concerto (2016), commissioned by Naples Philharmonic & Detroit Symphony
- Concerto for Turntables and Orchestra II (2016), commissioned by Casa da Musica
- Violin Concerto '1914' (2014), commissioned by BBC Proms and Orchestre Philharmonique de Luxembourg
- Concerto for Trumpet, Percussion, Turntables & Orchestra (2014), commissioned by Orchestre de Pau Pays de Béarn
- Cello Concerto (2013), commissioned by Alexander Ivashkin and Saint Petersburg Philharmonia
- Concerto for Bass Drum and Orchestra (2012), commissioned by Princeton Symphony and London Contemporary Orchestra
- Concerto for Turntables and Orchestra No.1 (2006), commissioned by Will Dutta, Chimera Productions. Symphonic version commissioned by the National Youth Orchestra of Great Britain
- Olga’s Miniatures (2017), commissioned by Andrey Boreyko and Naples Philharmonic
- Two Caprices for Violin and Orchestra (2016), commissioned by Orchestre de Pau Pays de Béarn
- Spheres (2012), commissioned by Daniel Hope & Deutsche Grammophon

=== Orchestra ===
- When the City Rules (2016), commissioned by Seattle Symphony and Real Oquesta Sinfónica de Sevilla
- Carnet de Voyage (2015), commissioned by Orchestre de Pau Pays de Béarn
- Overture 87654321 (2014), commissioned by Orchestre de Pau Pays de Béarn
- Dial 1-900 Mix-A-Lot (2014), commissioned by Seattle Symphony & Ludovic Morlot
- Ruthven's Last Dance (2013), commissioned by Ricciotti Ensemble
- Beethoven9 Symphonic Remix (2011), commissioned by Orchestre National des Pays de la Loire
- A-Turner (2010), commissioned by Saint Petersburg Conservatory

=== Chamber ===
- Techno Suite (2023)
- Litvinenko Suite (2022)
- Piano Trio No.1 (2022), commissioned for the Van Baerle Trio by Tivoli Vredenberg and Muziekgebouw
- Pastoral Reflections (2021)
- Dr Calvin Remembers (2021)
- Breaking Screens (2020)
- Techno Suite (2019)
- Broken Screen (2017), commissioned by Alison Balsom
- The River Conqueror (2015), commissioned by Orchestre de Pau Pays de Béarn
- Violin Duo No.1 (2014), commissioned by Retorica Duo, with LICA and Jersey International Music Festival
- Pieces for Erhu & Piano (2015), commissioned by New Sound China UK
- Howl for Electronics + Soloist (2013)
- Six Observations for Flute Trio (2013), commissioned for Tempest Flute Trio by Nonclassical
- Triangles (2012), commissioned by Fari Shams for Raimund Abraham Musikerhaus, Museum Insel Hombroich
- Cello Multitracks (2011)
- Bogle Move (Jamaican Dancehall) (2010), commissioned by The Smith Quartet
- String Quartet No.3 (2010), commissioned by the Ruysdael Kwartet
- Piano Book No1 (2009), commissioned by GéNiA and Nonclassical
- Stolen Guitars (2008), commissioned by POW Ensemble for Gaudeamus Foundation
- IMPORT/EXPORT (2008)
- Sleeveless Scherzo (2008), commission by Rambert Dance Company
- String Quartet No.2 (2007), commissioned by PRS Foundation for the Elysian Quartet
- Two Dances (2004), commissioned by Arts Council England for Tate Ensemble
- String Quartet No.1 (2003), commissioned by The Elysian Quartet
- Journeys of a Cattleherd (1997)

=== Stage and dance ===
- Sense of Time (2019), commissioned by Birmingham Royal Ballet
- Strings (2018), commissioned by Washington University and MUPA
- Spring (2018)
- Dark Glow (2016), commissioned by Stuttgart Ballet
- Bayadere - The Ninth Life (2015), commissioned by Shobana Jeyasingh Dance Company for the Royal Opera House
- Terra Incognita (2014), commissioned by Rambert Dance Company
- Strange Blooms (2013), commissioned by Shobana Jeyasingh Dance Company
- Howl (2013), commissioned by Luzerner Ballet
- The Ghost of Gunby Hall (2012), commissioned by Lincoln Arts
- 'Ein Winternachtstraum' - Ballet of Midsummer Night's Dream (2011), commissioned by Bern Ballet and Bern Symphony Orchestra

=== Electronic ===
- Strange Blooms (suite) (2013)
- Café Perdu (1999)
- Punch Me! Bite Me! (1998)
- Zhiva (1998)

=== Vocal and opera ===
- Elizabetta (2019)
- The Lonely Giant (2009)
- Simple Songs for Modern Life (2009), commissioned by PRS Foundation for Juice Vocal Ensemble
- Magnificat and Nunc Dimitis (1998)

=== Film, TV and digital ===
- Litvinenko (2022)
- OK Computer (2021)
- 22:22 (2017), commissioned by FLAMIN, (Film London Artists’ Moving Image), ACE and The Elephant Trust
- Opponent (2014), commissioned by Film London and Channel 4 for Random Acts
- Melior Street (2011), commissioned by Film London
- Pig Alley (2008), commissioned by Opera North

== Discography ==
=== Studio albums ===
- Breaking Screens (2021)
- Concerto for Turntables No.1 & Cello Concerto (2020)
- Beethoven Reimagined (2020)
- Saxophone Concerto, Bass Drum Concerto (2019)
- Gabriel Prokofiev Selected Classical Works 2003-2012 (2014)
- Cello Multitracks (2012)
- Import/Export (Gabriel Prokofiev: Suite for Global Junk) (2010)
- Gabriel Prokofiev: Piano Book No.1 (2010)
- Gabriel Prokofiev: Concerto for Turntables and Orchestra No.1 (2009)
- Gabriel Prokofiev: String Quartet No.2 (2007)
- Gabriel Prokofiev: String Quartet No.1 (2004)

=== EPs ===
- Strange Blooms (2022)
- HOWL! (2022)
- Float Dance EP2 (2014)
- Float Dance EP1 (2014)

=== Soundtracks ===
- Litvinenko (Original Soundtrack from the ITV Drama) (2022)
