= Sinan (crater) =

Crater on Mercury

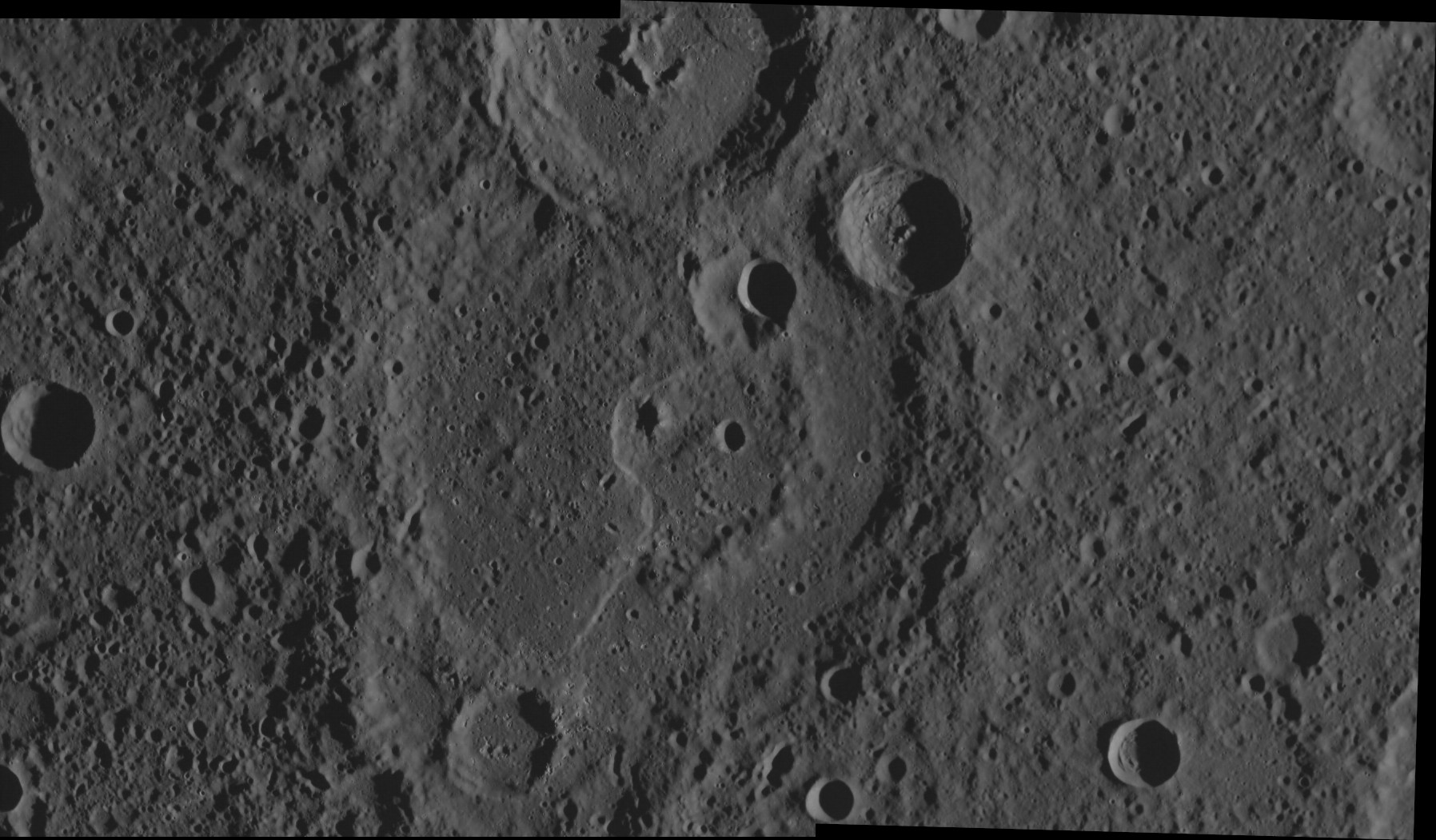
- Mosaic of MESSENGER WAC images
- Feature type: Impact crater
- Location: Kuiper quadrangle, Mercury
- Coordinates: 15.46°N 30.59°W
- Diameter: 134 km (83 mi)
- Eponym: Mimar Sinan

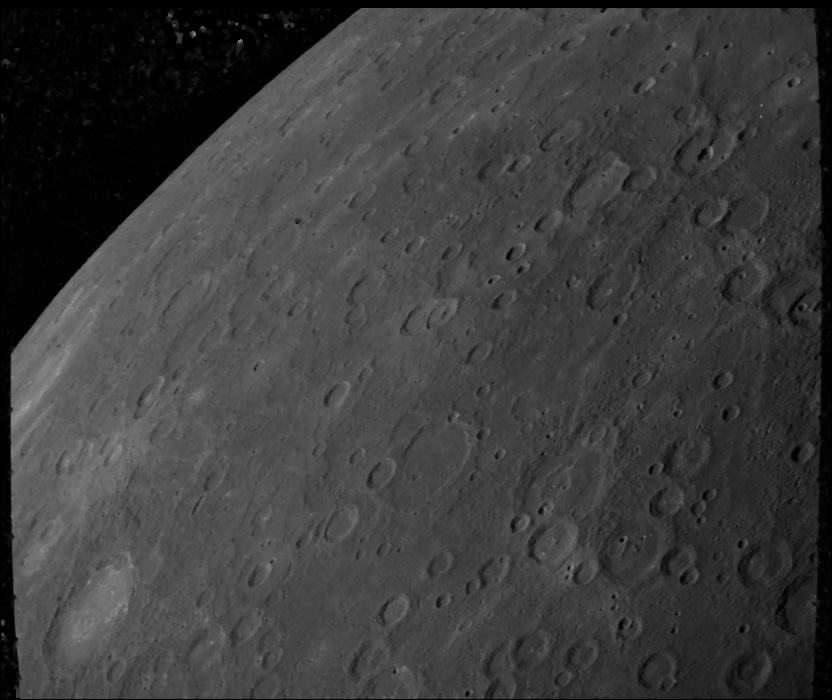
Mariner 10 image with Sinan below right of center

Sinan is an impact crater on the planet Mercury, 134 kilometers in diameter. It is located northeast of the crater Yeats and southeast of the crater Li Po. It has one craterlet on the south-southwestern side of the crater floor, and it has a symmetrical pit slightly west of the center. Together with a smaller unnamed crater on its southern border, the crater Sinan forms a shape similar to that of the spade found in card games. The crater is named after Mimar Sinan, a 16th-century Turkish architect. The name was adopted by the International Astronomical Union in 1976.
