= Repin (crater) =

Crater on Mercury

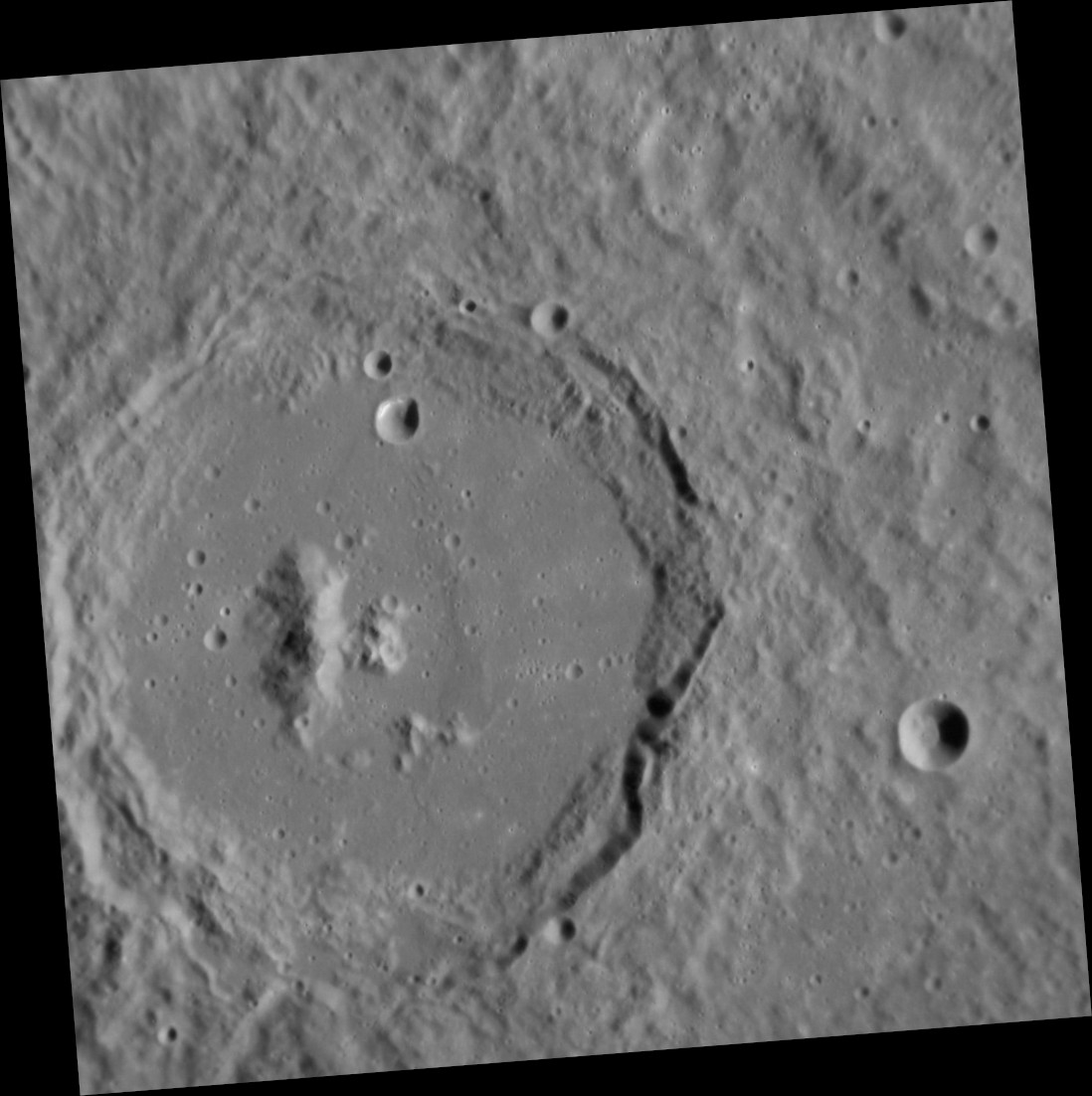
- MESSENGER NAC
- Planet: Mercury
- Coordinates: 19.12°S 63.33°W
- Quadrangle: Kuiper
- Diameter: 95.0 km (59.0 mi)
- Eponym: Ilya Repin

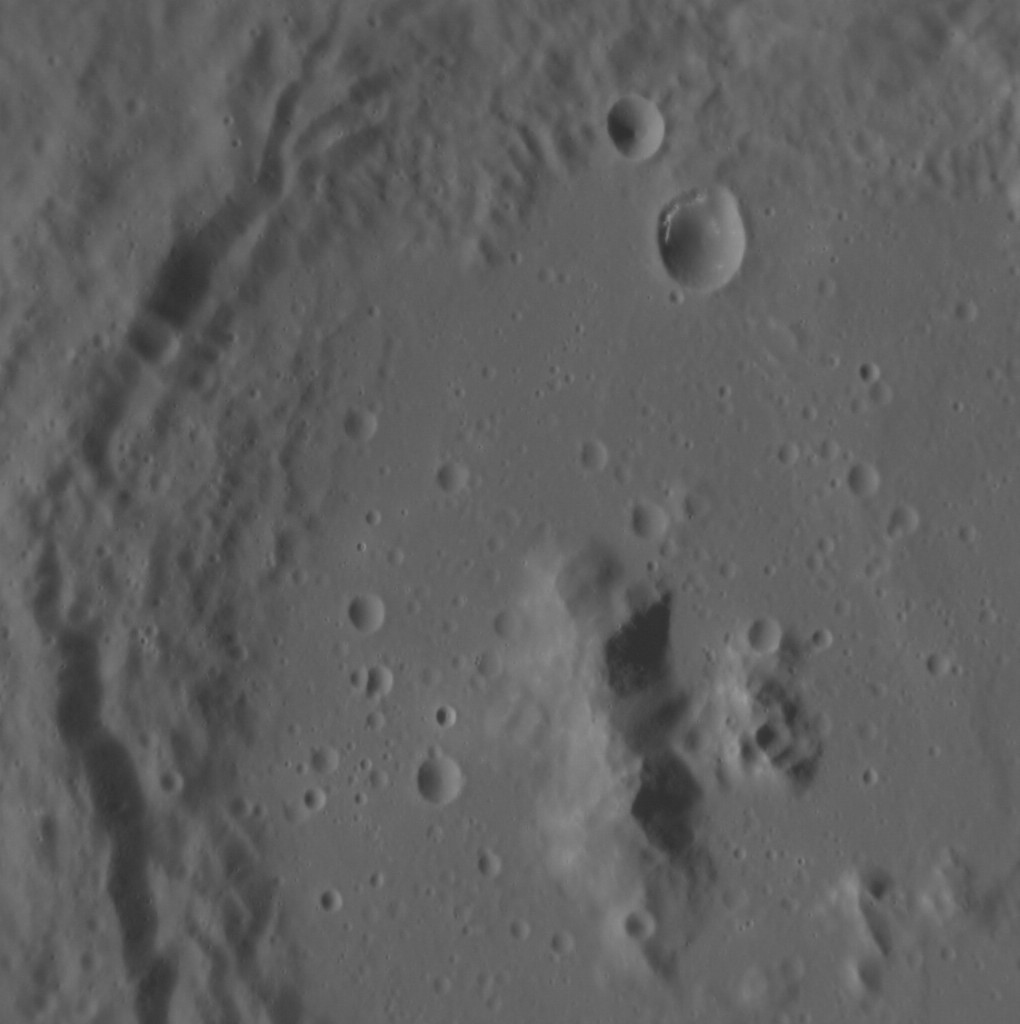
Detail of interior

Repin is a crater on Mercury. Its name was adopted by the International Astronomical Union (IAU) in 1976. Repin is named for the Russian painter Ilya Repin. The crater was first imaged by Mariner 10 in 1974.

To the east of Repin is the large crater Renoir.
