= Handel (crater) =

Crater on Mercury

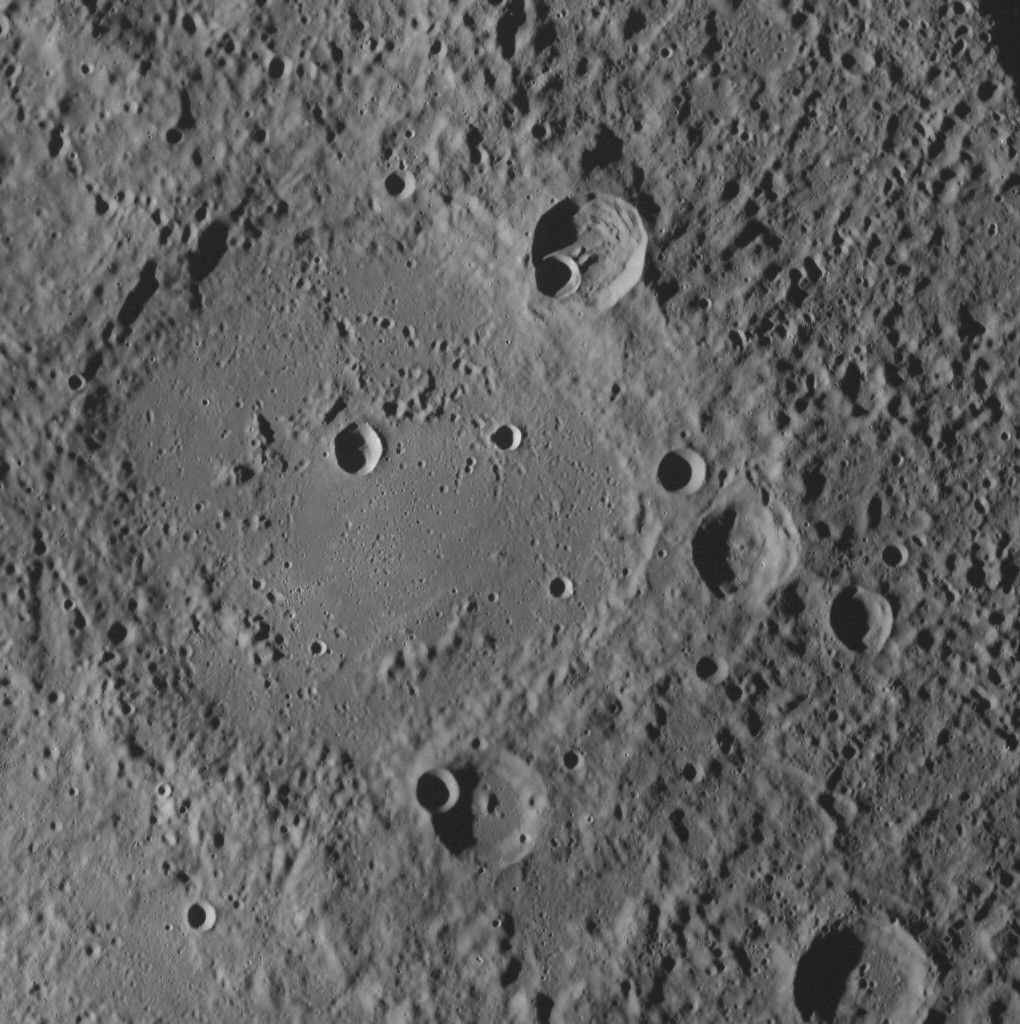
- MESSENGER WAC image of Handel
- Feature type: Peak-ring impact basin
- Location: Kuiper quadrangle, Mercury
- Coordinates: 3.4°N 33.8°W
- Diameter: 166 km (103 mi)
- Eponym: George Frideric Handel

Handel is a crater on Mercury. It has a diameter of 166 kilometers. Its name was adopted by the International Astronomical Union in 1976. Handel is named for the British-German composer George Frideric Handel, who lived from 1685 to 1759.

Handel is one of 110 peak ring basins on Mercury.

Handel is located northeast of the small crater Dominici, which itself is within the large crater Homer. To the north of Handel is Yeats crater.
