= Renoir (disambiguation) =

Pierre-Auguste Renoir (1841–1919) was a French artist.

Renoir may also refer to:

- Renoir (surname)
- Renoir (crater), a crater on the planet Mercury
- Renoir (2012 film), a French drama film
- Renoir (2025 film), a Japanese-language coming-of-age drama film
- "Renoir" (Baskets), an episode of the TV series Baskets
- Renoir Dessendre, a character in the video game Clair Obscur: Expedition 33
