= Calvino (crater) =

Crater on Mercury

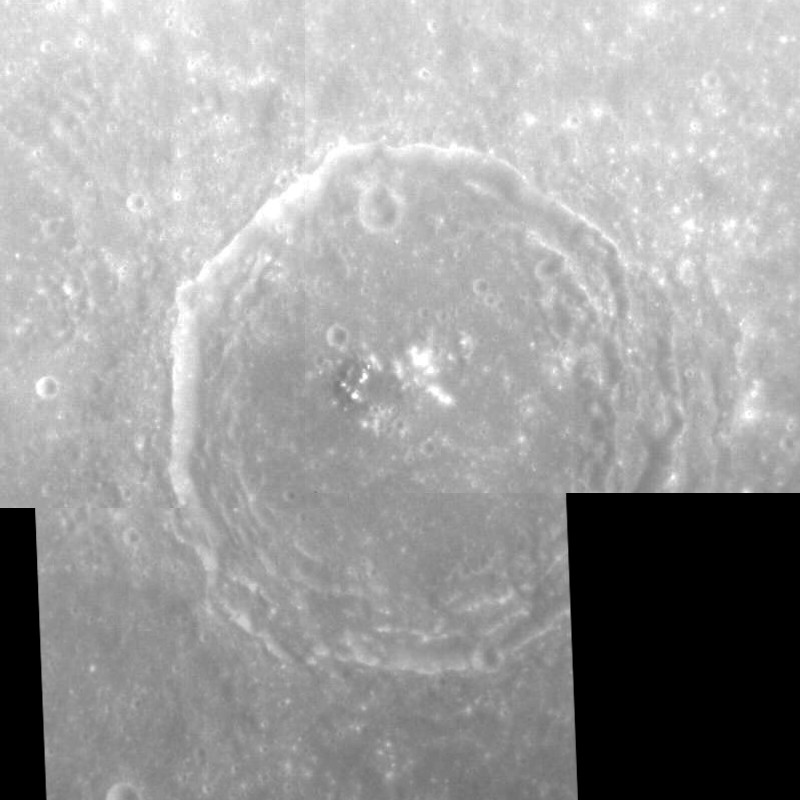
- Mosaic of MESSENGER NAC images focused on Calvino
- Feature type: Impact crater
- Location: Kuiper quadrangle, Mercury
- Coordinates: 3.99°S 56.03°W
- Diameter: 67 km
- Eponym: Italo Calvino

Calvino is a crater on Mercury. Its name was adopted by the IAU in 2016, after the Italian writer Italo Calvino. The crater was first imaged by Mariner 10 in 1974.

Calvino lies in the center of Sihtu Planitia, and Rūdaki crater is to the east.

== Views ==
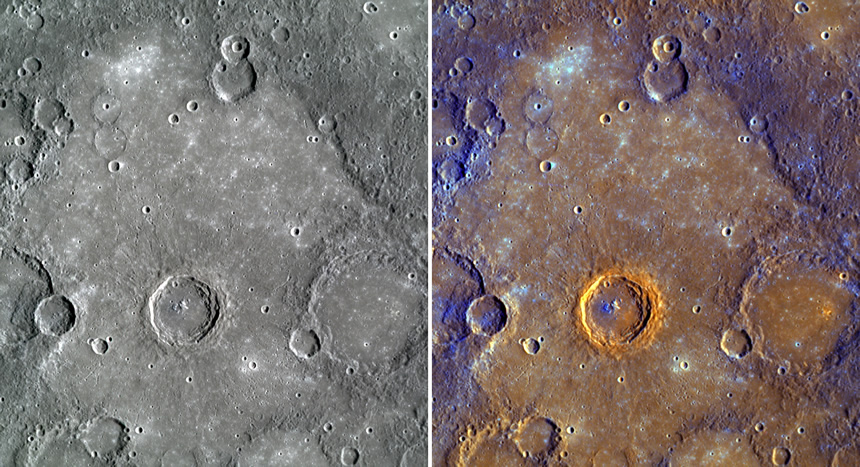
Calvino crater at center of each image. The left image was created by combining WAC images from three narrow-band color filters to approximate Mercury's color as it would be seen by the human eye. The right image used a statistical analysis of all 11 WAC filters to highlight subtle color differences on the surface.
