= Rūdaki (crater) =

Crater on Mercury

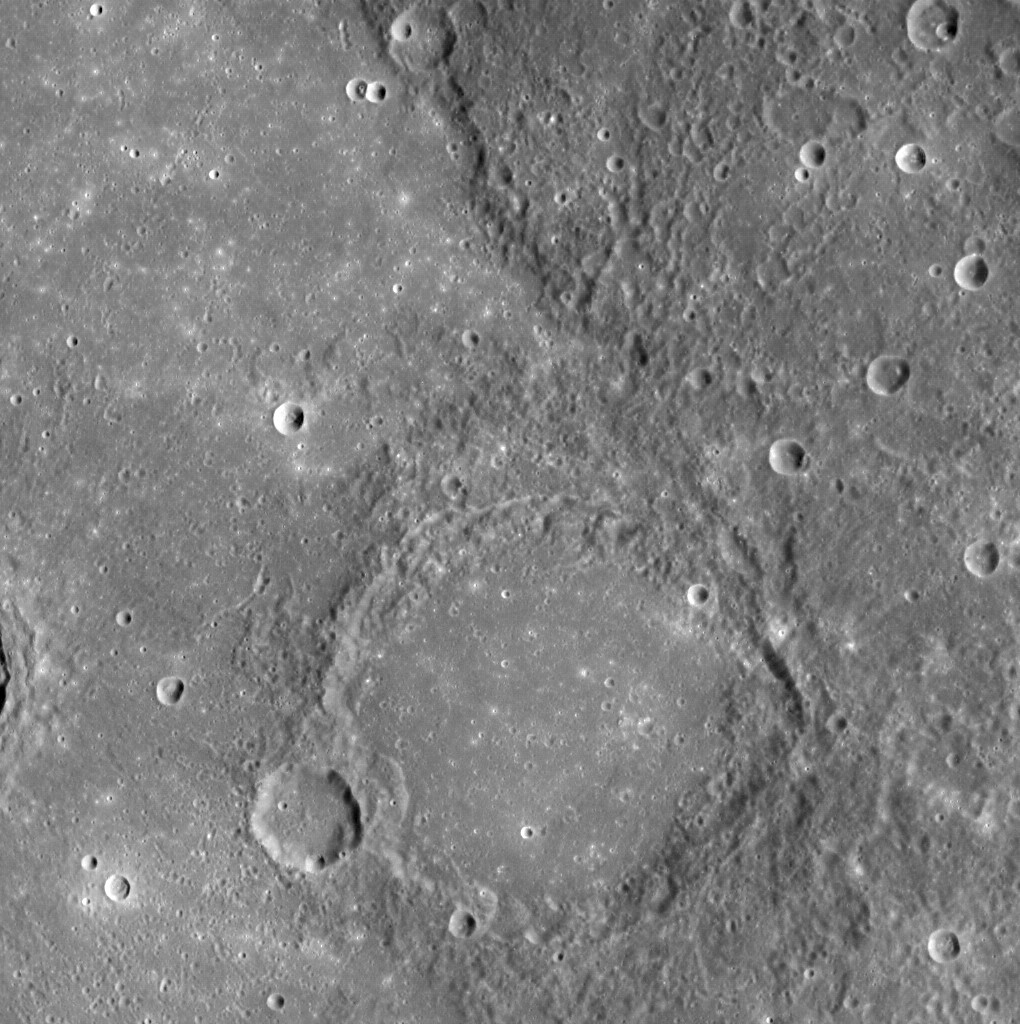
- Rūdaki (below center)
- Feature type: Impact crater
- Location: Kuiper quadrangle, Mercury
- Coordinates: 3.97°S 51.76°W
- Diameter: 124 km (77 mi)
- Eponym: Rudaki

Rūdaki is a crater on Mercury. Its name was adopted by the IAU in 1976, after the Persian poet Rudaki. The crater was first imaged by Mariner 10 in 1974.

On the floor of Rudaki and also in a broad region surrounding it to the west are smooth plains, which are far less cratered than the neighboring terrain (except for the small secondary craters from Calvino crater, to the west of Rudaki). Detailed studies of Mariner 10 images led to the conclusion that these plains near Rūdaki, now called Sihtu Planitia, were formed by volcanic flows on the surface of Mercury.

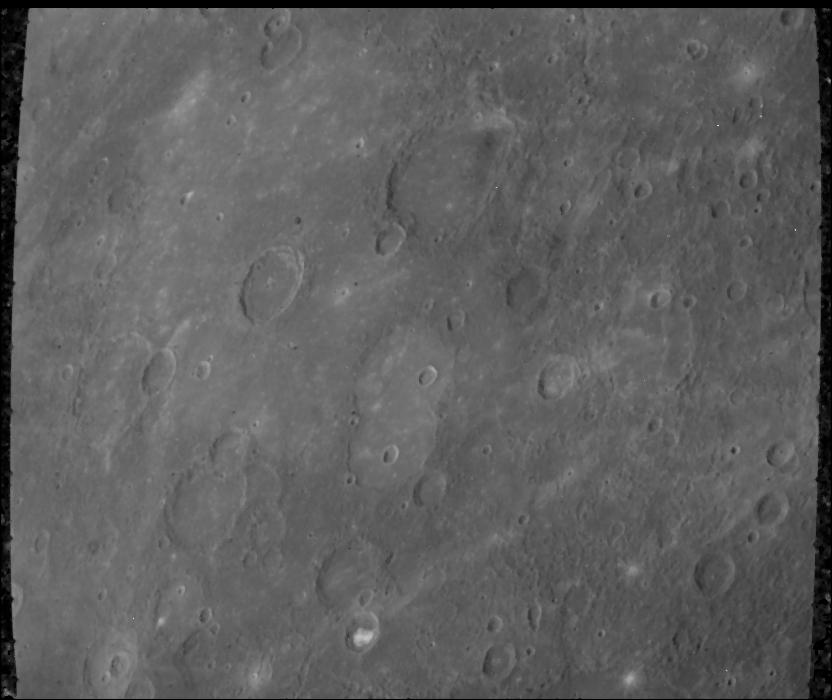
Mariner 10 image with Rūdaki above center
