= Yeats (crater) =

Crater on Mercury

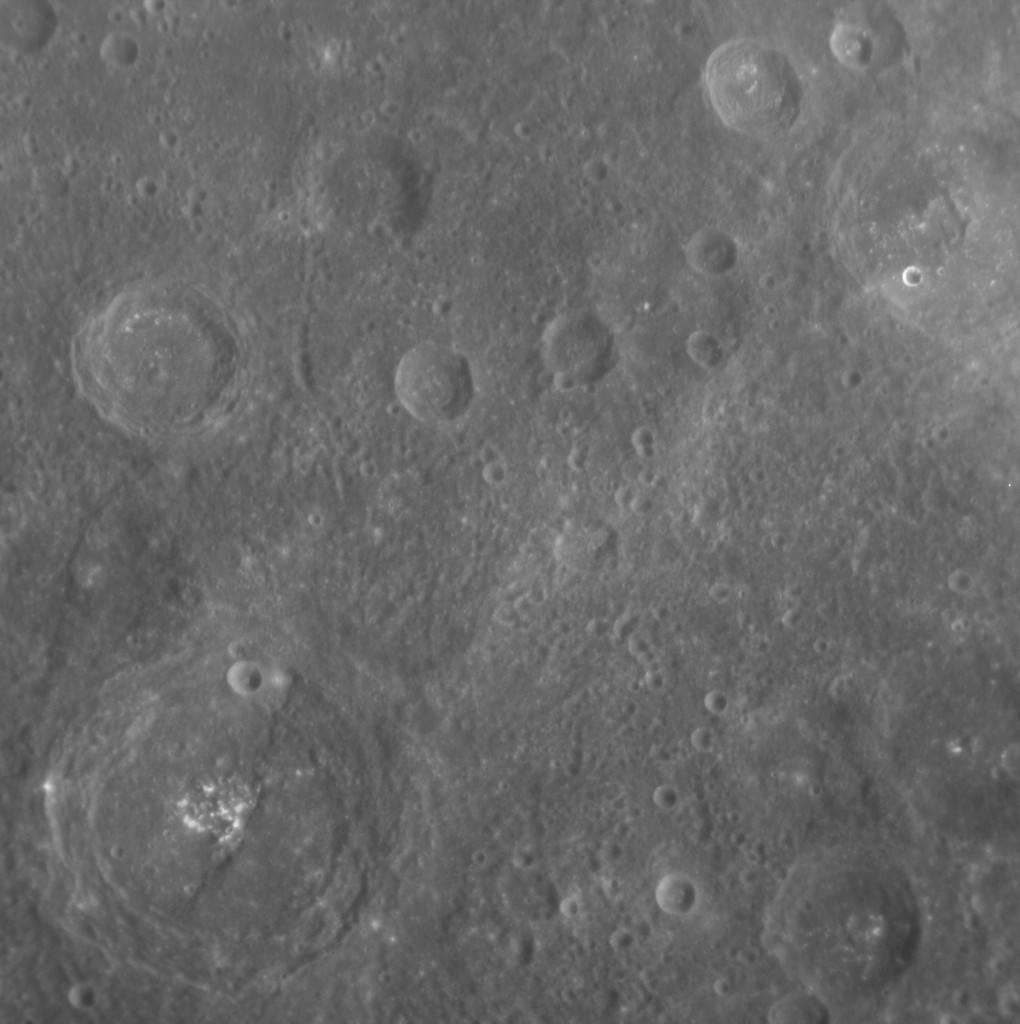
- MESSENGER NAC image from its second flyby of Mercury in October 2008, with Yeats in lower left
- Feature type: Impact crater
- Location: Kuiper quadrangle, Mercury
- Coordinates: 9.44°N 35.03°W
- Diameter: 92 km
- Eponym: William Butler Yeats

Yeats is an impact crater on the planet Mercury. It is named after William Butler Yeats, an Irish poet and dramatist. The name was adopted by the International Astronomical Union in 1976.

The rim of Yeats is circular and intact, except where an indentation is made by a crater on the north side. It is bordered by a smaller, unnamed crater to the northwest. There is a scarp cutting across the crater which trends northeast. The central peak is complex, and there are hollows on the east and west sides of the peak.

Yeats is located south of the crater Li Po and southwest of the crater Sinan.

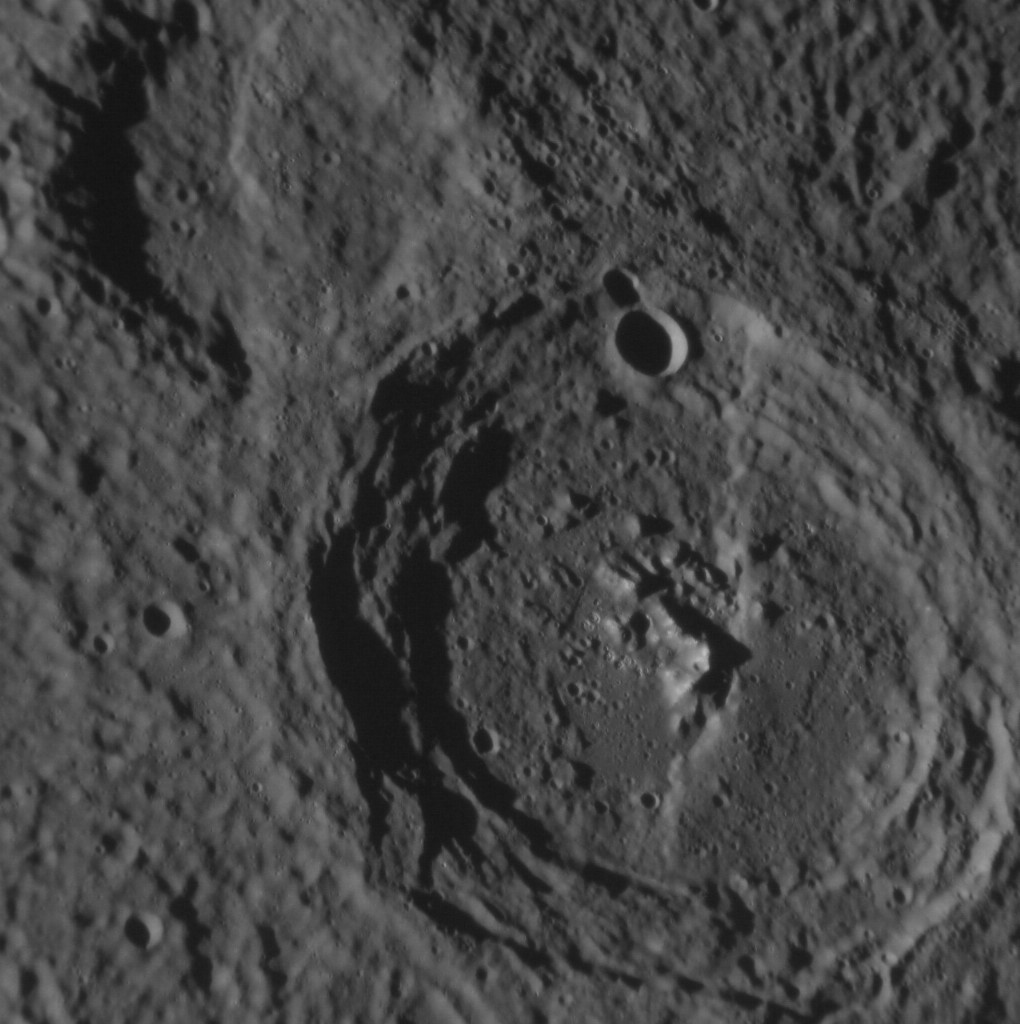
Oblique view at low sun angle

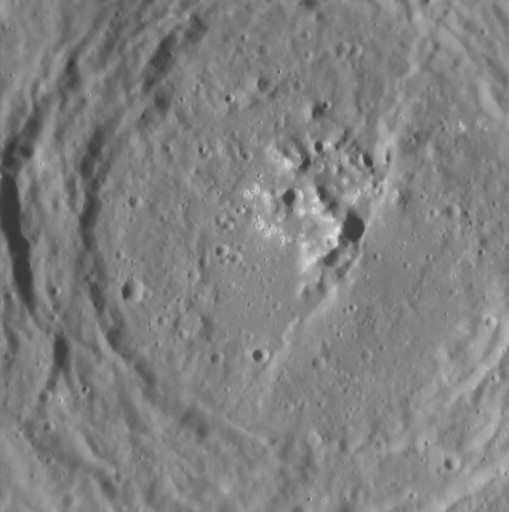
Interior of the crater, showing the hollows adjacent to the central peak
