= Homer (crater) =

Crater on Mercury

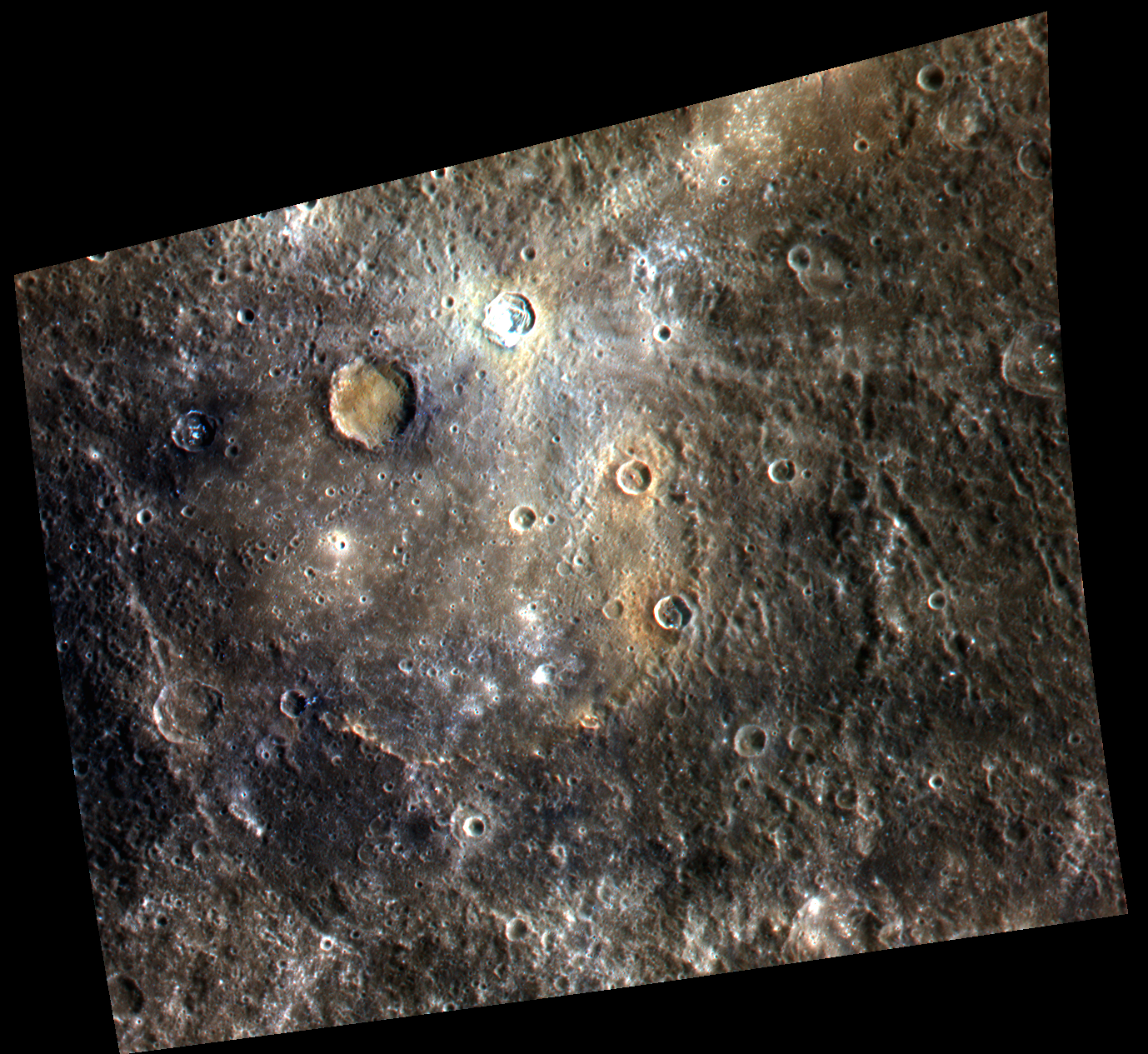
- Enhanced-color image of Homer, with Dominici crater at top
- Feature type: Impact crater
- Location: Kuiper quadrangle, Mercury
- Coordinates: 1.3°S 36.62°W
- Diameter: 319 km (198 mi)
- Eponym: Homer

Homer is a crater on Mercury. It is one of 110 peak ring basins on Mercury. It is Tolstojan in age. It is named after the greek poet Homer.

Deposits of material in and around this crater suggest the possibility of explosive volcanic eruptions at some point in the planet's history. An unnamed crater in northwestern Homer (about 18 km diameter) contains hollows and has dark ejecta.

The crater name was approved by the IAU in 1976. The naming of Stark Y crater on the Moon, located northwest of Stark, as Homer, was not approved by the IAU.

The small but fresh crater Dominici lies along the northern margin of Homer. The crater Handel is to the northeast, and Titian is to the southwest.
