= Maria de Dominici =

Maltese artist and sculptor (1645–1703)

Suor Maria de Dominici
- Born: 6 December 1645; Vittoriosa, Hospitaller Malta
- Died: 18 March 1703 (aged 57); Rome, Papal States
- Resting place: Santa Maria in Traspontina
- Known for: Sculpture; Painting

Suor Maria de Dominici (6 December 1645 – 18 March 1703) was a Maltese painter, sculptor, and Carmelite tertiary nun. Born into a family of artists based in the city of Birgu (Vittoriosa), she was the daughter of a goldsmith and appraiser for the Knights of Malta. Two of her brothers, Raimondo de Dominici and Francesco de Dominici, were painters. Raimondo's son Bernardo would write a contemporary art history book that included references to his aunt Maria.

== Biography ==
During her teens, de Dominici studied under the painter and sculptor Mattia Preti, who was painting and sculpting the interior of St. John's Co-Cathedral in Valletta at the time. She is believed to have contributed, and is specifically recorded as assisting Preti on his best known work, a series of paintings depicting the life and martyrdom of St John the Baptist (1661–1666), which decorates the vaults of the co-Cathedral.

She was a strong-minded and versatile person; characteristics clearly seen in the two wills she drafted. Giovannantonio Ciantar's Malta Illustrata (1772) paints a picture of a person who knew what she wanted to do with her life from a young age:

"[Maria showed a] repugnance to apply her energies to female duties and was thus often rebuked by her parents ... She would do nothing other than draw figures and other things according to her whim and natural talents. At last her parents, seeing her so inclined and disposed to painting, provided an art master to teach her design."

Being a Carmelite tertiary nun, she was free to live outside the convent walls and away from the constraints of family ties.

It appears that she was a quick study who flourished under Preti's tutelage. Giovannantonio Ciantar observes that "under his [Preti's] direction she worked well and as he was painting the ceiling of the Church of St John he allowed her to paint some of the female figures; in doing this she succeeded almost more felicitously than the master."

This is further corroborated by Giuseppe Maria de Piro's account in Squarci di Storia (1839): "[She] superseded any other of his pupils, so much so that the celebrated master chose her to collaborate with him in painting the great vault of the Church of St John, in which the female figures were, to a great extent, executed by her."

In 1682, de Dominici left Malta, probably with the entourage of the Grand Master's nephew and his wife Isabella d'Avalos d'Aquino d'Aragona, who, together with her master Preti, encouraged the artist to spread her wings abroad. She eventually had her own studio in Rome, where she began to receive sculpture and painting commissions thanks to letters of introduction from the Grand Master. In Rome, she lived with a woman companion at her studio near San Giovanni dei Fiorentini.

== Works ==
While in Malta, Maria de Dominici made a number of portable cult figures which were used during local religious festivities and street processions. Several works are attributed to her name, though not all are easily accessible for viewing. The most accessible of de Dominici's works in Malta include: The Visitation, in the Żebbuġ parish church; Beato Franco in the Carmelite church of Valletta and Annunciation in the Cathedral Museum of Valletta.

== Tribute ==
Her profile is included in the two-volume Dictionary of Women Artists, edited by Delia Gaze.

In 2010, a crater on Mercury was named after her.

It was the inclusion of Delia Gaze's dictionary in the Mercury name bank that led to Dominici's name being applied to the crater lettered 'D' after the second fly-by of the NASA-MESSENGER. As Susanna Hoe remarks in her introduction to Malta: Women, History, Books and Places:

"Exciting or not as an explanation, the thought of a crater on Mercury named after a neglected Maltese woman artist is delightful, inspiring even, particularly when you come across Maria's crater on the internet, a lovely sight!".
