= Brunelleschi (crater) =

Crater on Mercury

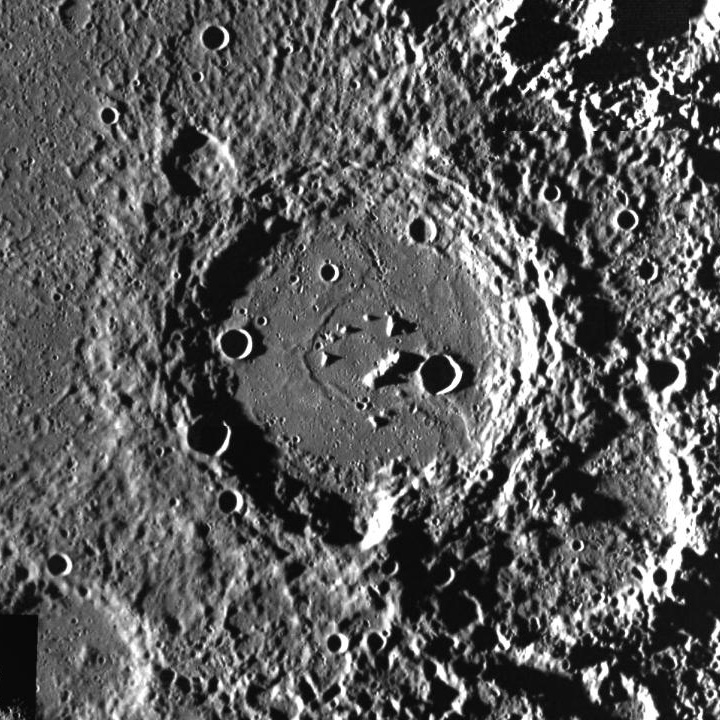
- MESSENGER WAC mosaic of Brunelleschi
- Feature type: Impact crater
- Location: Kuiper quadrangle, Mercury
- Coordinates: 9.1°S 22.2°W
- Diameter: 128.57 km
- Eponym: Filippo Brunelleschi

Brunelleschi is a crater on Mercury. It has a diameter of 128.57 kilometres (79.89 mi). Its name was adopted by the International Astronomical Union (IAU) in 1976. Brunelleschi is named for the Italian architect Filippo Brunelleschi, who lived from 1377 to 1446.

== Views ==
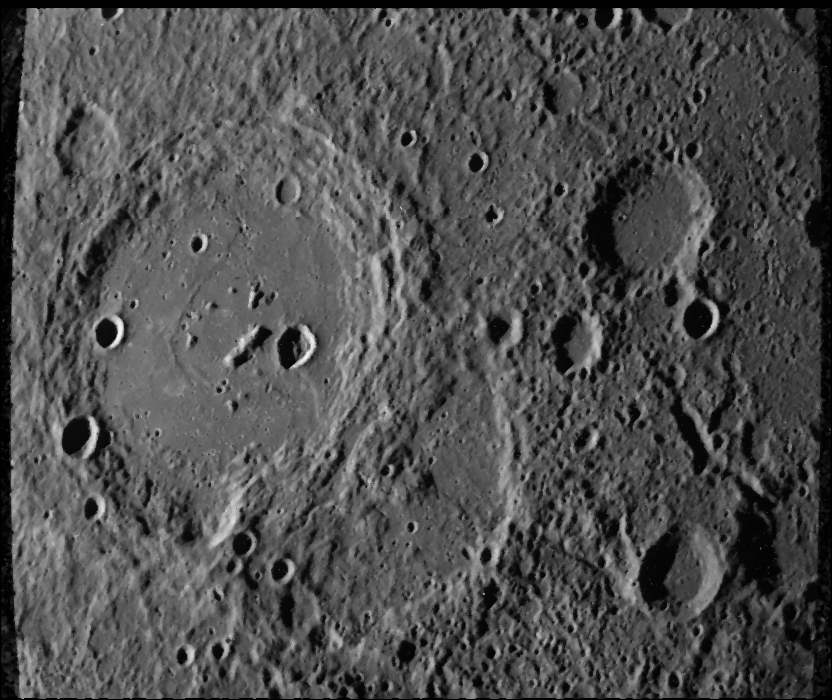
Mariner 10 image with Brunelleschi at left

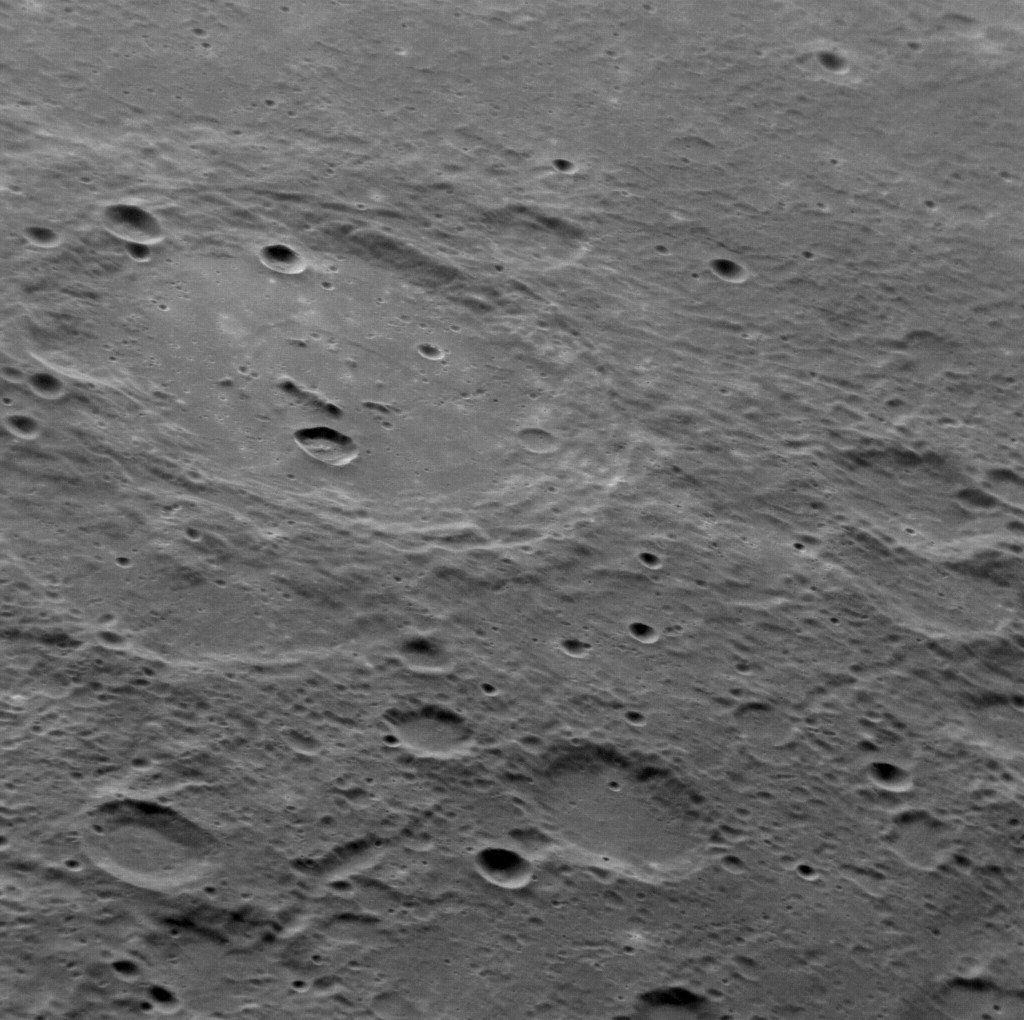
Oblique view from MESSENGER
