= Renoir (surname) =

Renoir is a surname, a phonetic corruption of the French surname, "Renouard."

== People with the surname Renoir ==
- Pierre-Auguste Renoir (1841–1919), French Impressionist painter
- Pierre Renoir (1885–1952), French actor and son of Pierre-Auguste Renoir
- Jean Renoir (1894–1979), French film director and son of Pierre-Auguste Renoir
- Claude Renoir (1901–1969), French film producer and son of Pierre-Auguste Renoir
- Claude Renoir (1913–1993), French cinematographer and son of Pierre Renoir, grandson of Pierre-Auguste Renoir
- Sophie Renoir (born 1964), French actress, daughter of the younger Claude

== See also ==
- Renoir (crater), a crater on the planet Mercury
- LG KC910 Renoir, a 2008 smartphone
- Renoir Towers in Buenos Aires, Argentina
- Renoir (film), a 2012 French film about the French painter Pierre-Auguste Renoir
- AMD Renoir, an Accelerated Processing Unit (APU) series by AMD
