= Dominici (crater) =

Crater on Mercury

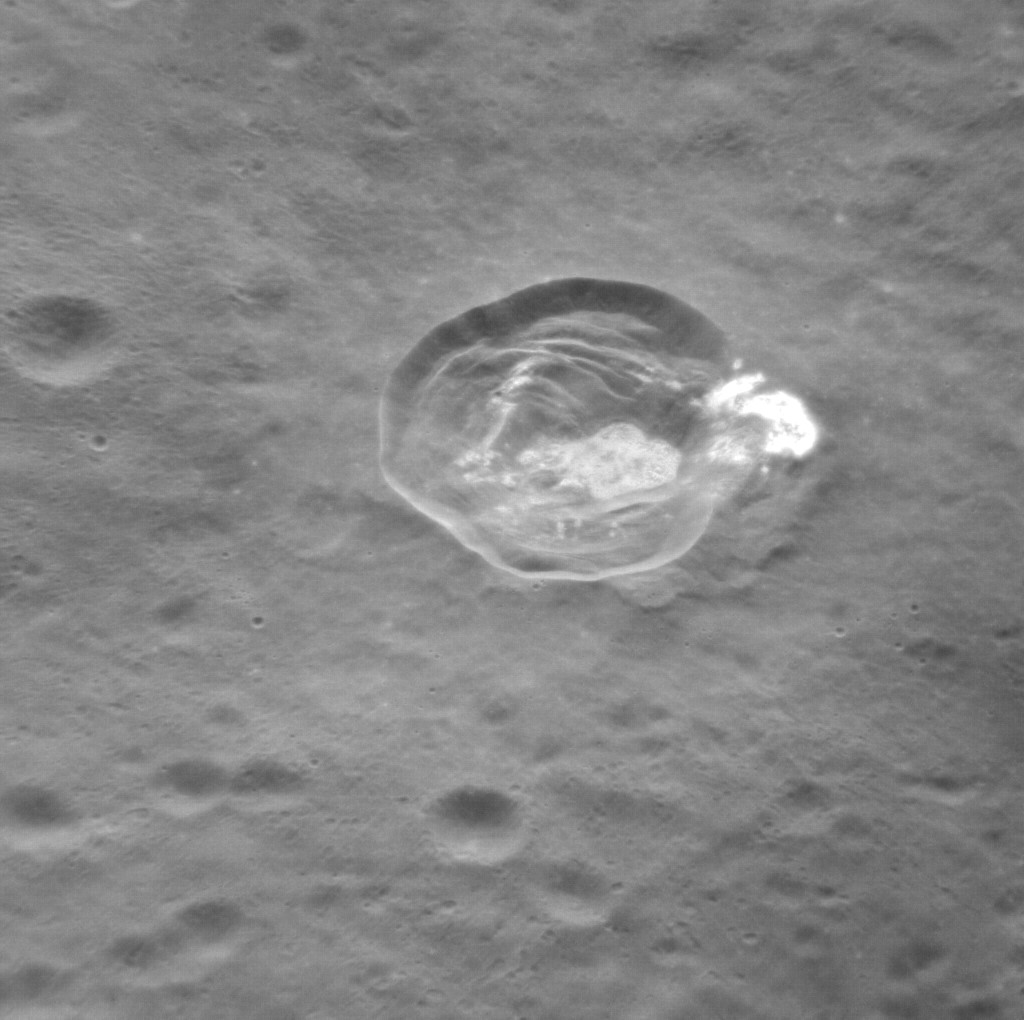
- MESSENGER NAC image of Dominici
- Feature type: Impact crater
- Location: Kuiper quadrangle, Mercury
- Coordinates: 1.29°N 36.49°W
- Diameter: 20.0 km (12.4 mi)
- Eponym: Maria de Dominici

Dominici is a crater on Mercury. It was named by the IAU in 2010.

Dominici's bright rays indicate that it is relatively young, and the young rays appear light blue in enhanced-color images. Dominici also has bright material on its floor and is surrounded by crater ejecta and material that appears orange in enhanced color. These color differences, as in nearby Titian crater, suggest that the impact crater excavated material from beneath Mercury's surface that differs in composition from the surrounding surface. Dominici lies within a much larger impact structure, the Homer basin.

Bright areas in and around Dominici are hollows.

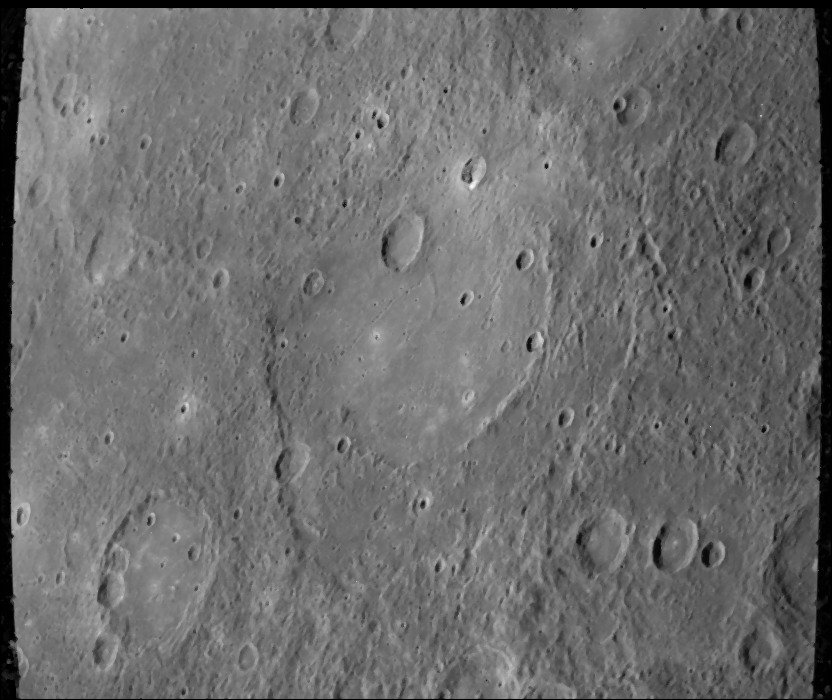
Mariner 10 image of Homer with Dominici near top

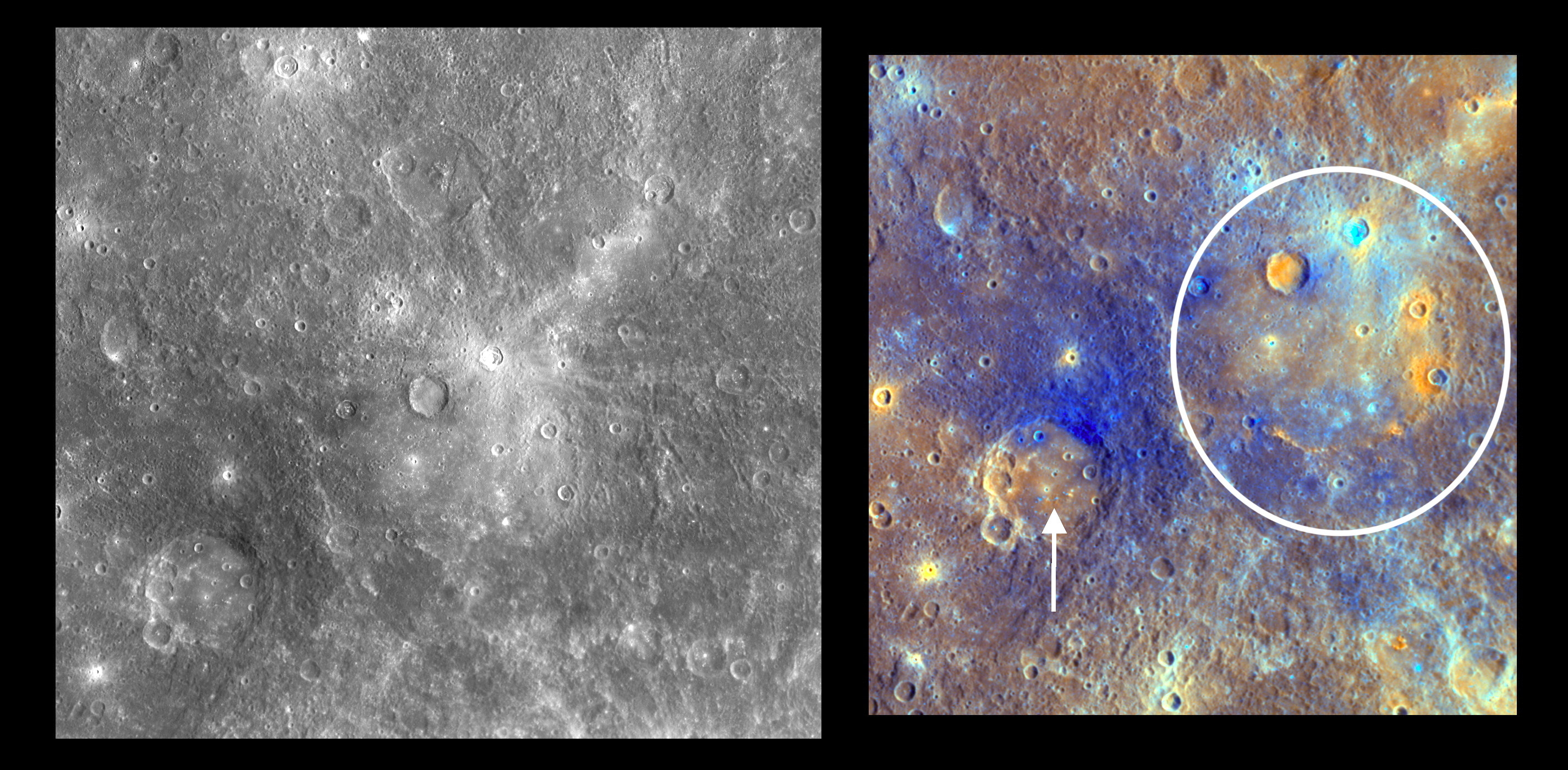
Homer basin is marked with a white circle in the enhanced-color image. Nearby Titian crater is marked with an arrow.
