= Titian (crater) =

Crater on Mercury

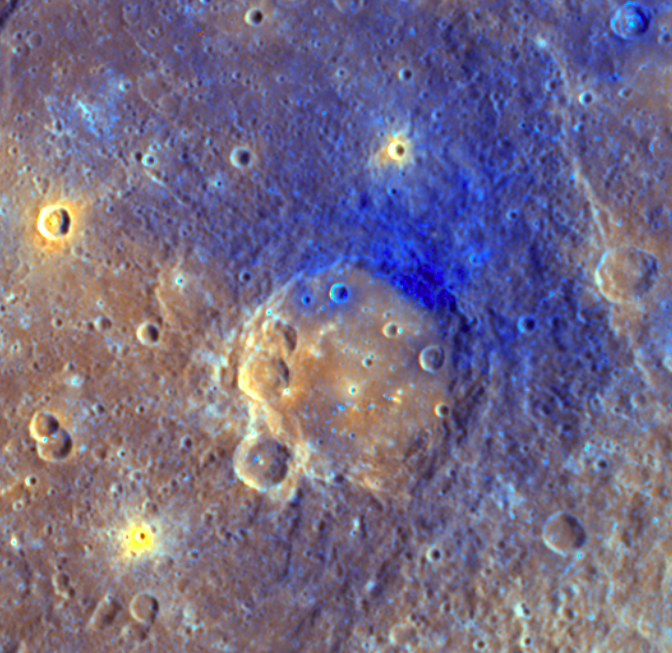
- Enhanced-colour image of Titian (MESSENGER image)
- Feature type: Impact crater
- Location: Kuiper quadrangle, Mercury
- Coordinates: 3.69°S 42.53°W
- Diameter: 109.0 km (67.7 mi)
- Eponym: Titian

Titian is an impact crater on the planet Mercury. It was named by the IAU in 1976.

In an enhanced color image, viewed from the MESSENGER spacecraft, the smooth floor of Titian is a brighter orange color than the surrounding area, likely due to being filled with volcanic material. Ejecta from Titian appear blue and cover much of the surface surrounding the crater. This material was excavated from depth during the crater's formation. Later impacts, such as the one that produced the small crater that appears yellow in the upper center of the image, excavated material from below the Titian ejecta. This yellow-appearing material was present at or near the surface before the impact that created Titian and is a different composition (and thus, color) from its surroundings.

Titian is located to the southwest of the large basin Homer. It lies on the east side of a larger, unnamed crater that is Tolstojan in age.

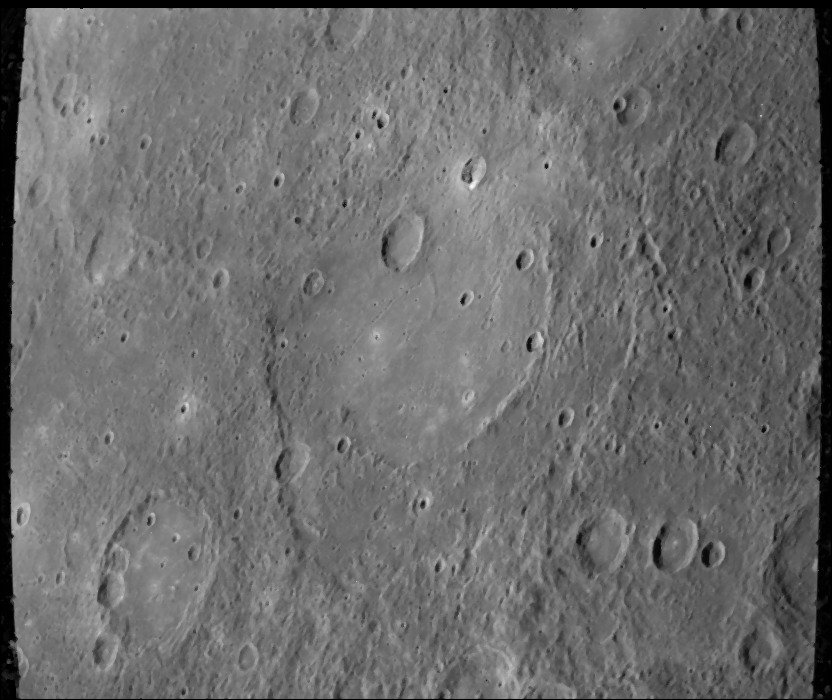
Mariner 10 image with Titian in lower left

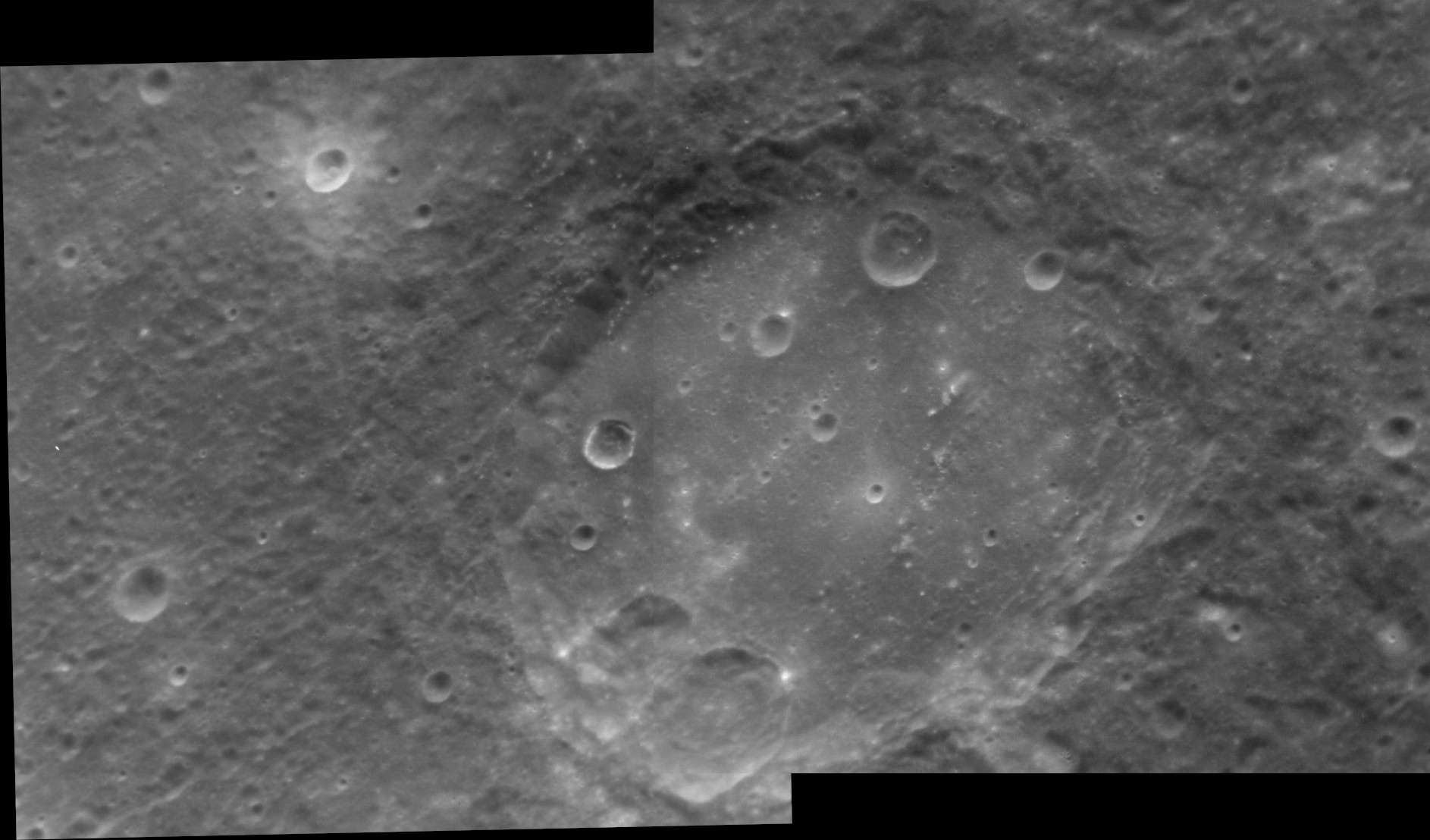
MESSENGER mosaic
