= Li Po (crater) =

Crater on Mercury

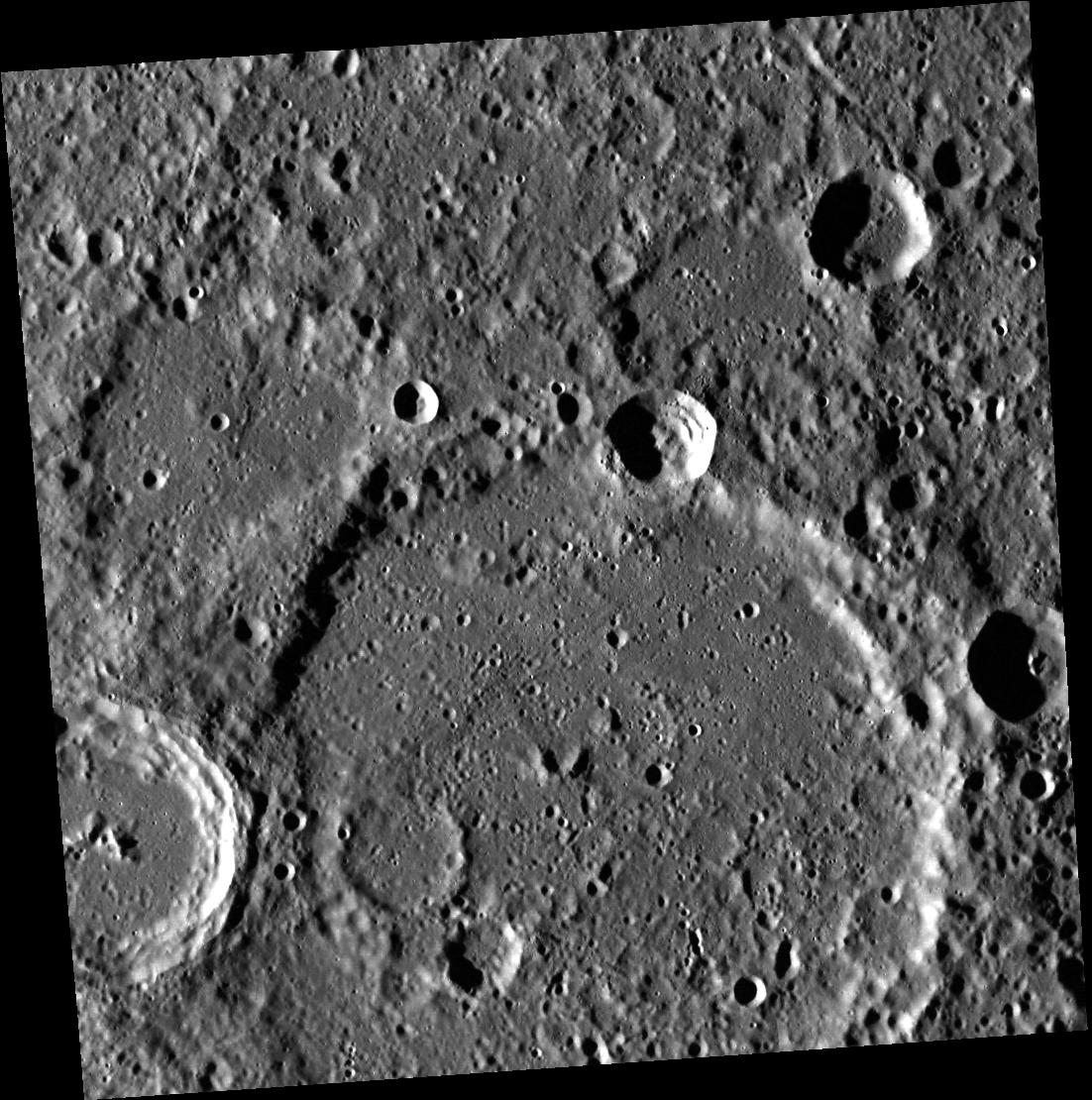
- Feature type: Impact crater
- Location: Kuiper quadrangle, Mercury
- Coordinates: 16.9°N 35.0°W
- Diameter: 120 km
- Eponym: Li Bai

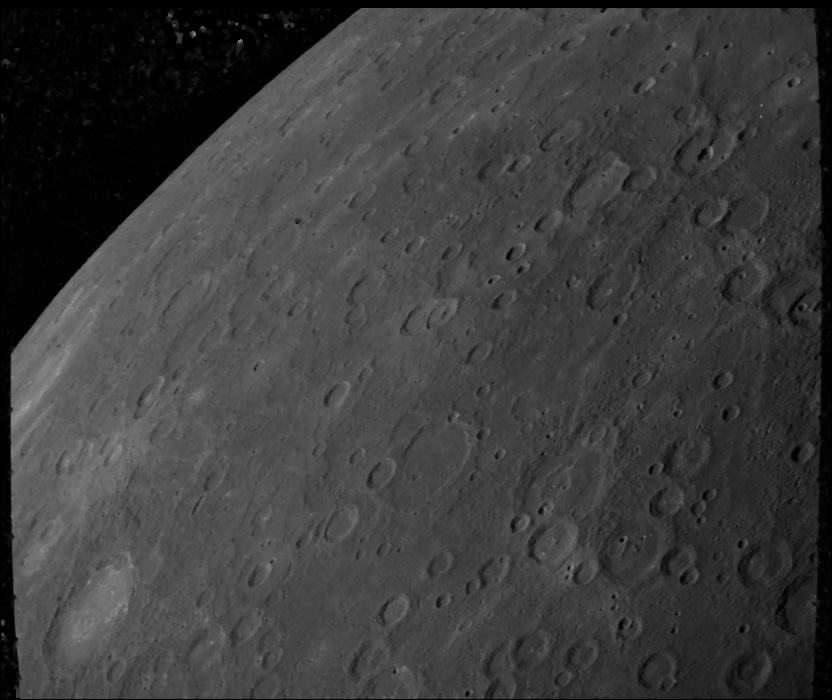
Mariner 10 image with Li Po below center

Li Po is a crater on Mercury. It has a diameter of 120 kilometers. Its name was adopted by the International Astronomical Union (IAU) in 1976. Li Po is named for the Chinese poet Li Bai, who lived from 701 to 762.
