= Sihtu Planitia =

Geologic basin on Mercury

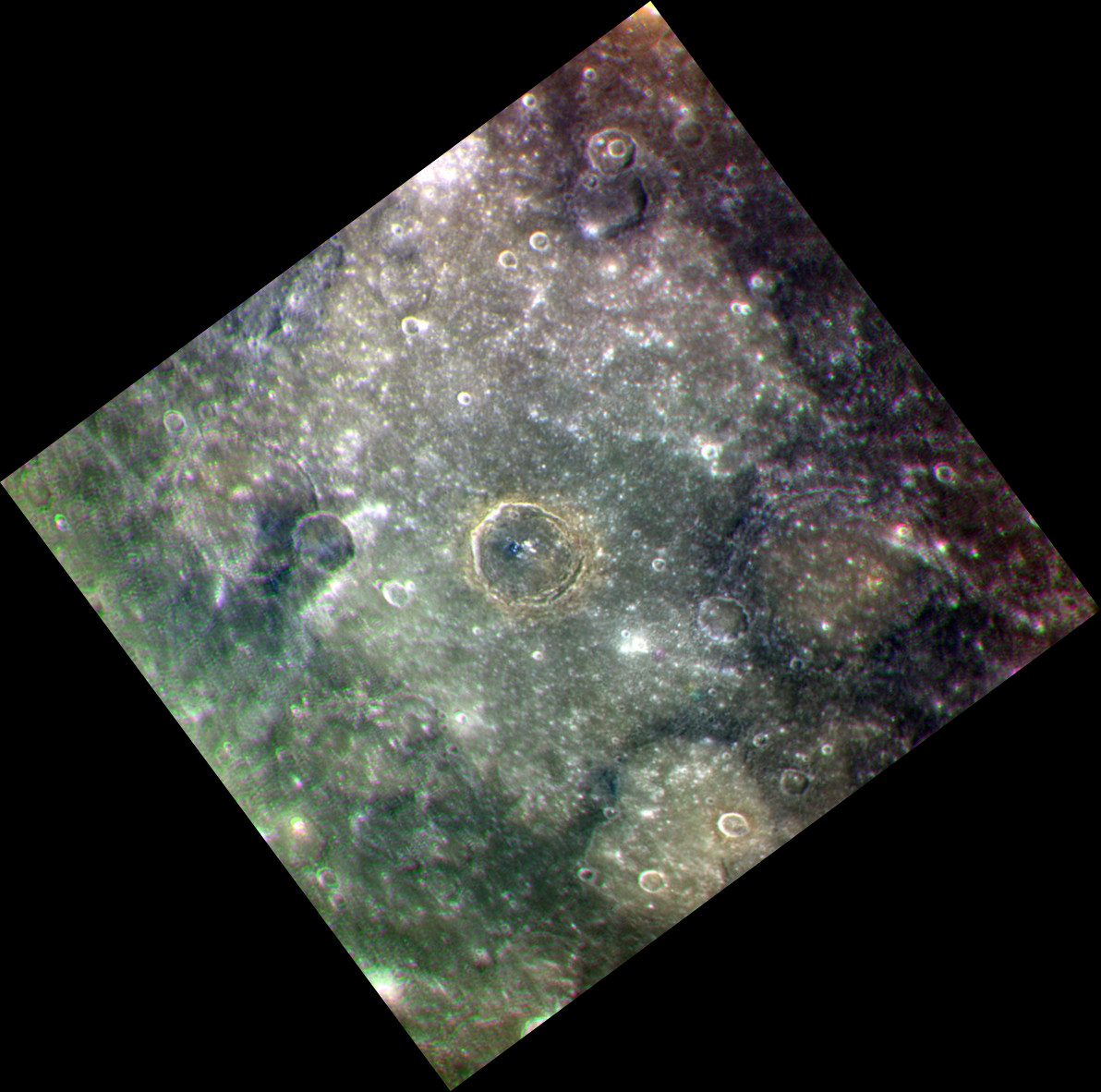
- MESSENGER approximate color WAC image
- Feature type: Planitia
- Coordinates: 2.82°S 55.57°W
- Eponym: Babylonian word for the planet Mercury

Sihtu Planitia is a large plain on Mercury, approximately 565 km across. It was named in 2017 by the IAU. The plain was first imaged by Mariner 10 in 1974.

The crater Calvino lies at the center of the Planitia, and Rūdaki is on the east side.

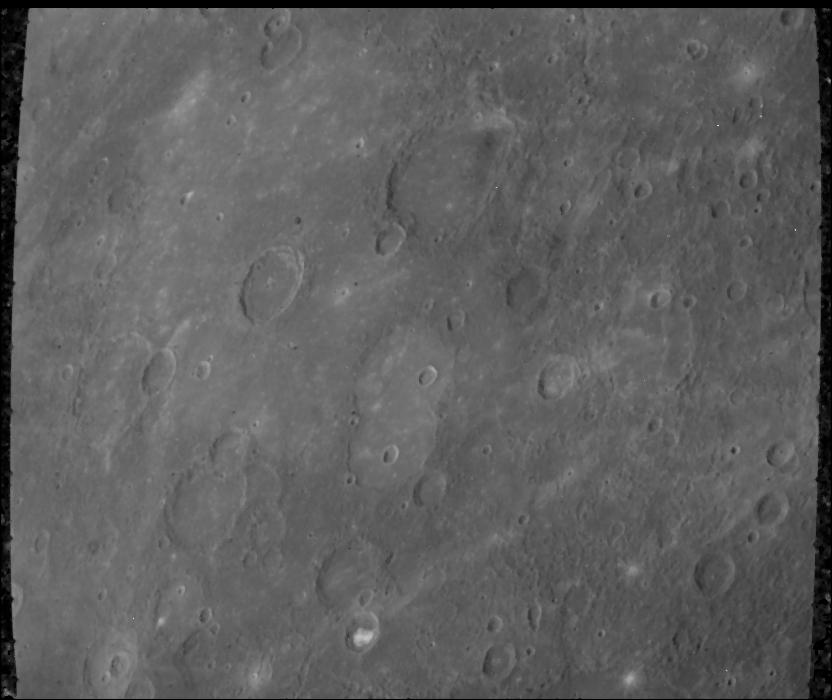
Mariner 10 image of Sihtu Planitia and vicinity
