= Renoir (crater) =

Crater on Mercury

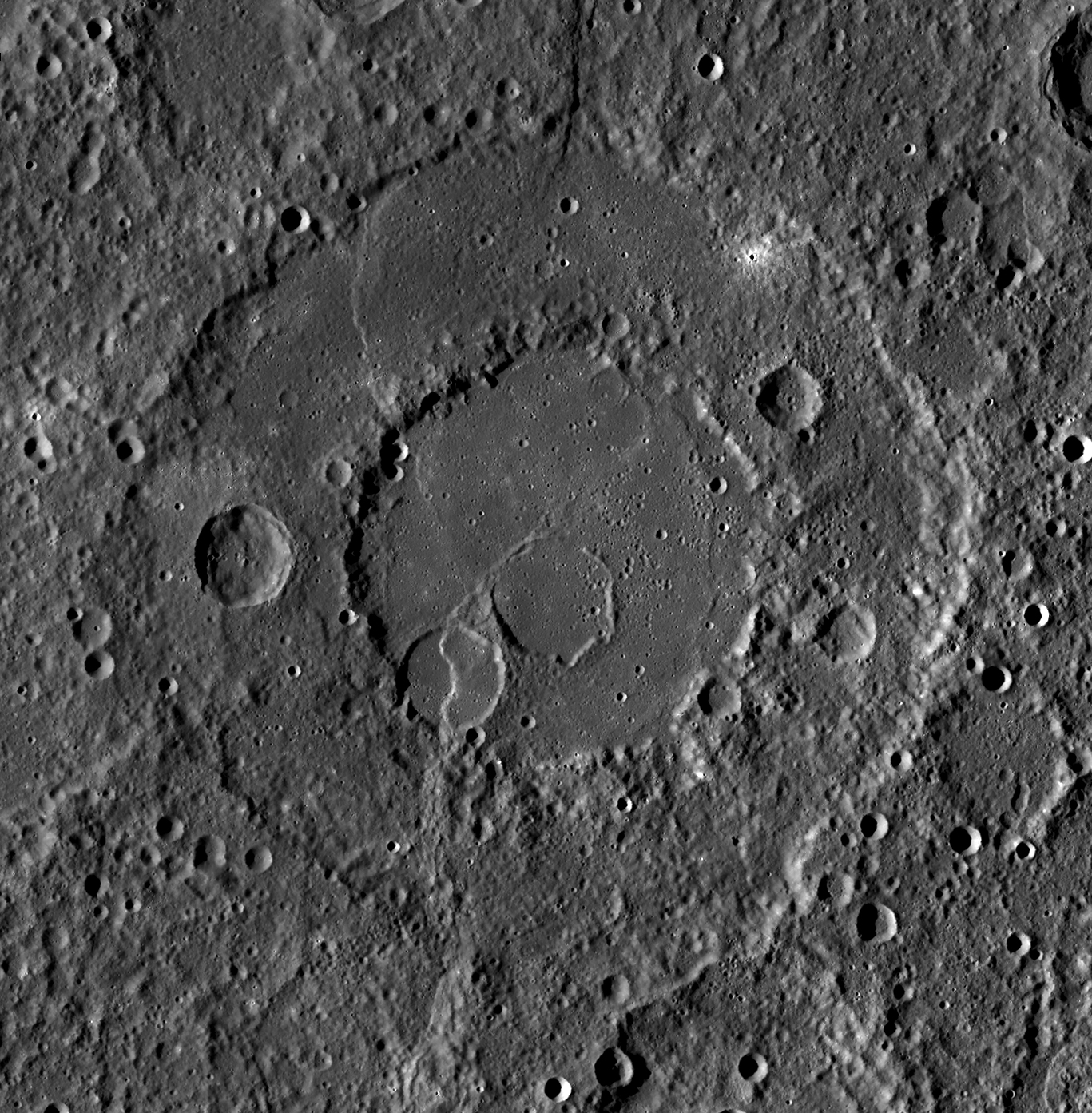
- Renoir crater as seen by the MESSENGER spacecraft
- Feature type: Peak-ring impact basin
- Location: Kuiper quadrangle, Mercury
- Coordinates: 18.34°S 52.01°W
- Diameter: 220.0 km (136.7 mi)
- Eponym: Pierre-Auguste Renoir

Renoir is a crater on the planet Mercury. Its name, after the French painter Pierre-Auguste Renoir (1841–1919), was adopted by the International Astronomical Union in 1976.

== Information ==
Renoir is a peak ring basin, one of 110 on Mercury, including Raditladi and Rachmaninoff. Though these basins are relatively young geologic features, Renoir is one of the oldest of its type. Because of its greater age, Renoir displays more of the effects of tectonics and later impact events than the other peak ring impact basins. It is thought to have formed at the end of the period with the highest meteor impact rates in Mercury's history. It is located in the Kuiper quadrangle. Renoir also has an area of high reflectance, classified as a plain, resulting from previous volcanic activity on the planet. Like Rachmaninoff, it is a basin with a high-reflectance plain located entirely within the central peak ring.

== Structure ==
Renoir has a concentric ring structure, meaning that it is also called a "concentric ring basin". Its interior rim is distinct, however, similar basins usually have a more distinct outer rim than inner rim. Basins like Renoir are known for having deep valleys in and around them. Mercury's lower radius and mass compared to other bodies like Mars mean that its basins - including Renoir and Rodin - have a greater diameter; consequently, the multi-ring basins on bodies like the Moon, including basins like Hertzsprung and Mare Orientale, are even larger than those on Mercury.

== Views ==
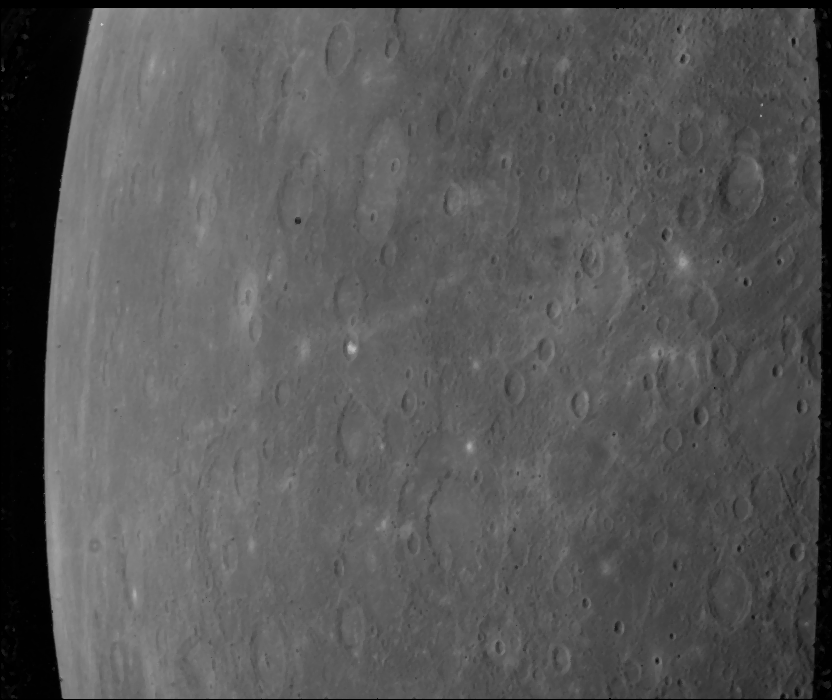
Mariner 10 image with Renoir at bottom

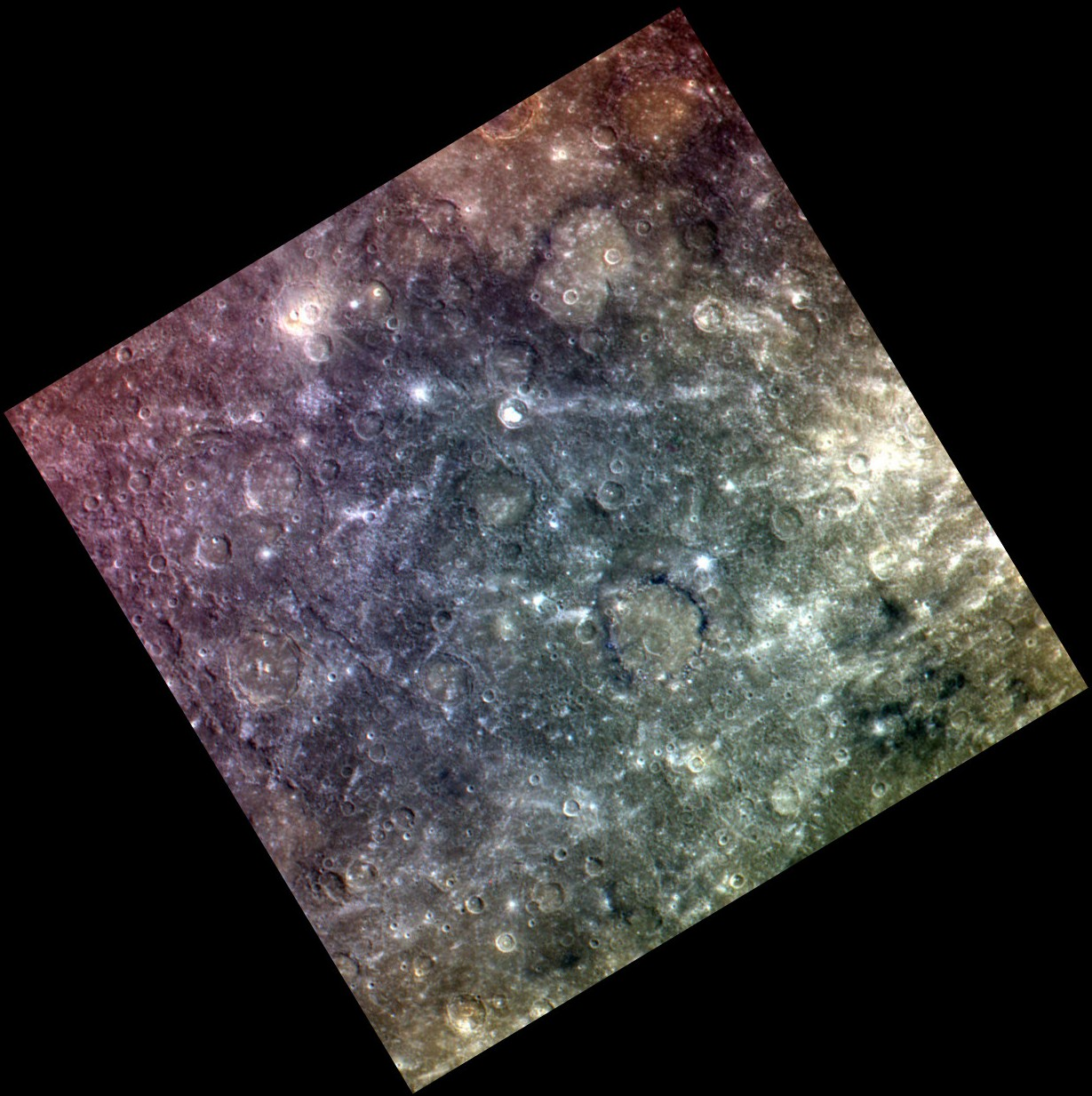
Regional approximate color image with Renoir below center

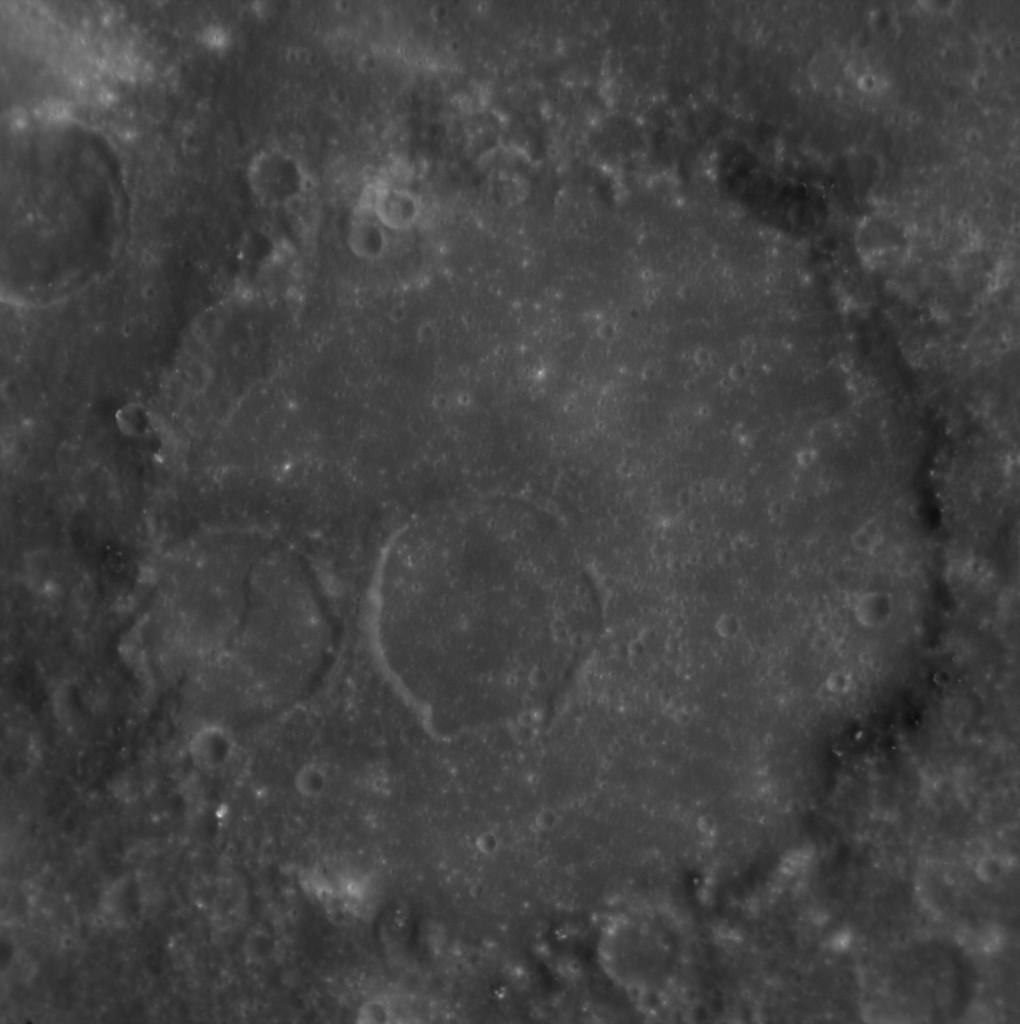
Central Renoir - note the dark parts of the peak ring

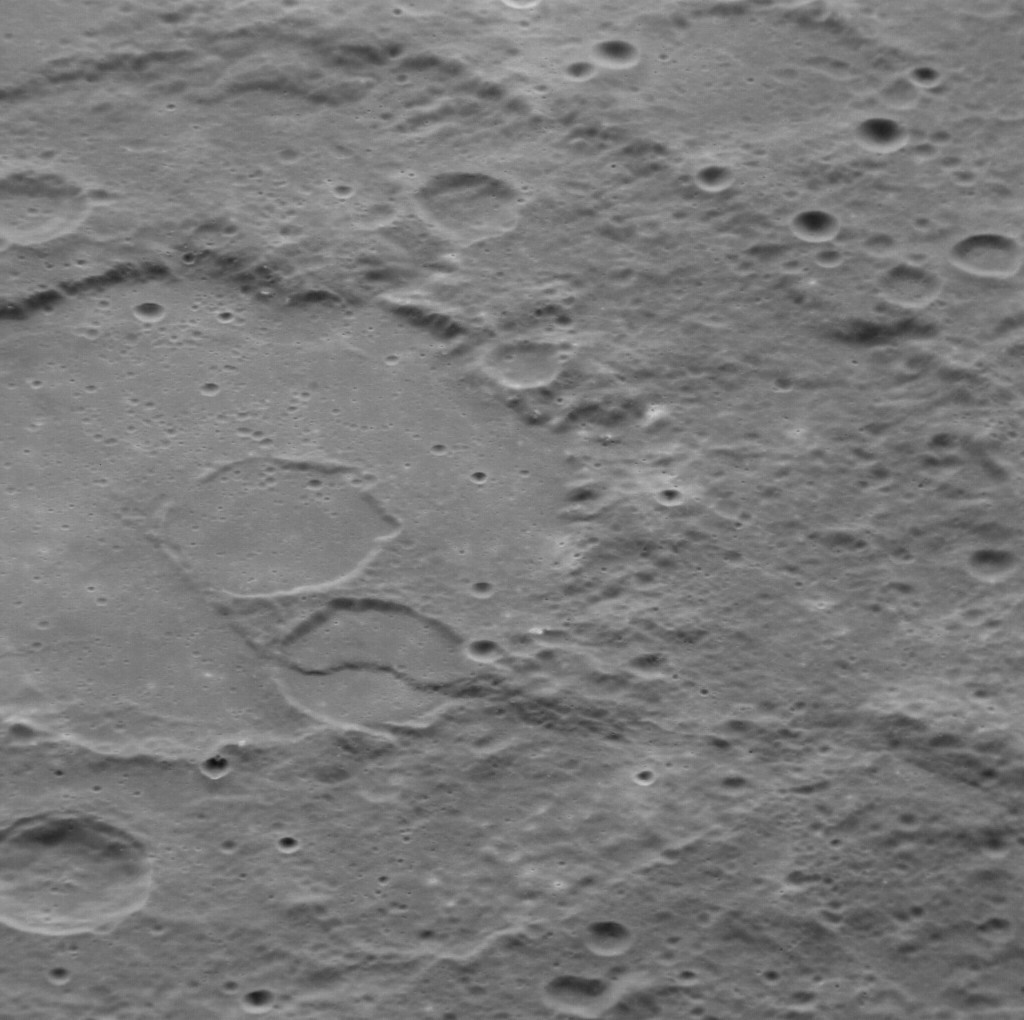
Oblique view of southern Renoir

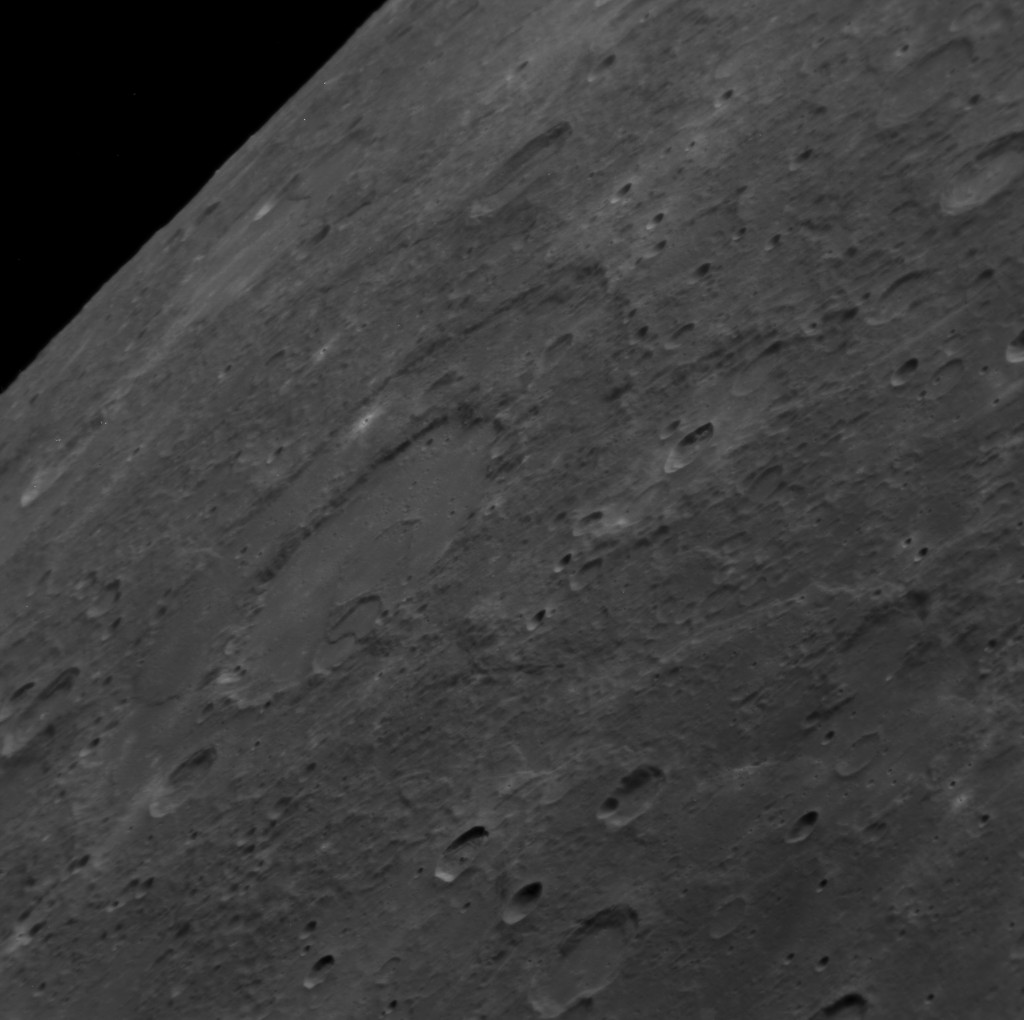
Another oblique view
