= 1776 Kuiper =

Main-belt asteroid

Discovery
- Discovered by: C. J. van Houten; I. van Houten-G. T. Gehrels
- Discovery site: Palomar Obs.
- Discovery date: 24 September 1960

Designations
- Named after: Gerard Kuiper (Dutch astronomer)
- Alternative designations: 2520 P-L · 1930 EB; 1931 KK · 1938 SU; 1952 DQ_{2} · 1963 FJ
- Minor planet category: main-belt · (outer); Eos

Orbital characteristics
- Epoch 4 September 2017 (JD 2458000.5)
- Uncertainty parameter 0
- Observation arc: 87.08 yr (31,805 days)
- Aphelion: 3.1442 AU
- Perihelion: 3.0618 AU
- Semi-major axis: 3.1030 AU
- Eccentricity: 0.0133
- Orbital period (sidereal): 5.47 yr (1,996 days)
- Mean anomaly: 36.958°
- Mean motion: 0° 10^{m} 49.08^{s} / day
- Inclination: 9.4929°
- Longitude of ascending node: 176.68°
- Argument of perihelion: 306.29°

Physical characteristics
- Dimensions: 35.96±1.6 km (IRAS:9); 39.952±0.432
- Geometric albedo: 0.033±0.005; 0.0544±0.005 (IRAS:9)
- Absolute magnitude (H): 11.3

1776 Kuiper, provisional designation 2520 P-L, is a dark Eoan asteroid from the outer region of the asteroid belt, approximately 38 kilometers in diameter.

It was discovered on 24 September 1960, by Dutch astronomer couple Ingrid and Cornelis van Houten in collaboration with Dutch–American astronomer Tom Gehrels at the U.S. Palomar Observatory in California, and named after Dutch astronomer Gerard Kuiper.

== Orbit and classification ==
Kuiper is a member of the Eos family (606), the largest asteroid family in the outer main belt consisting of nearly 10,000 asteroids. It orbits the Sun in the outer asteroid belt at a distance of 3.1–3.1 AU once every 5 years and 6 months (1,996 days). Its orbit has an eccentricity of 0.01 and an inclination of 9° with respect to the ecliptic. Kuiper was first identified as 1930 EB at Heidelberg Observatory in 1930, extending its observation arc by 30 years prior to its official discovery observation.

=== Palomar–Leiden survey ===
The survey designation "P-L" stands for Palomar–Leiden, named after Palomar and Leiden Observatory, which collaborated on the fruitful Palomar–Leiden survey in the 1960s. Gehrels used Palomar's Samuel Oschin telescope (also known as the 48-inch Schmidt Telescope), and shipped the photographic plates to Ingrid and Cornelis van Houten at Leiden Observatory where astrometry was carried out. The trio are credited with the discovery of several thousand minor planets.

== Physical characteristics ==
According to the surveys carried out by IRAS and NASA's Wide-field Infrared Survey Explorer with its subsequent NEOWISE mission, Kuiper measures 36.0 and 40.0 kilometers in diameter, and its surface has a low albedo of 0.033 and 0.054, respectively. Typical value for C-, D- or P-type asteroids in the outer main-belt. However, as of 2017, Kuiper's composition, as well as its rotation period and shape remain unknown.

== Naming ==
This minor planet is named after Dutch–American astronomer Gerard Kuiper (1905–1973), initiator of the Palomar-Leiden survey. He was a well-known authority in the field of planetary science and director at the Lunar and Planetary Laboratory and at Yerkes Observatory. He discovered Miranda and Nereid, satellites of Uranus and Neptune, respectively.

The third zone of the Solar System, the Kuiper belt, is named after him. Also, the Mercurian crater Kuiper, the Martian crater Kuiper and the lunar crater Kuiper all bear his name. The official naming citation was published by the Minor Planet Center on 25 September 1971 (M.P.C. 3185).
