= Goldstone Catena =

Catena on Mercury

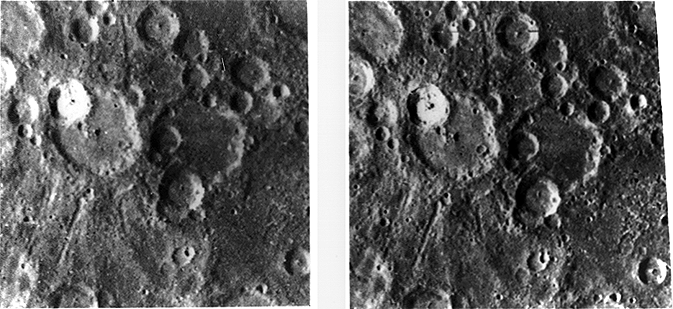
- Mariner 10 stereo images of Murasaki and Hiroshige craters. The 125 km diameter Murasaki is on the left, and 140 km Hiroshige on the right. Extending downward from Murasaki crater is Goldstone Catena
- Feature type: Catena
- Coordinates: 15.62°S 32.02°W
- Eponym: Goldstone Observatory

Goldstone Catena (Goldstone Vallis until March 2013) is a catena on Mercury located at 15.8 S, 31.7 W. It is named after Goldstone Observatory. It was originally named Goldstone Vallis, but the name was changed on 26 March 2013 to align with planetary feature naming themes. While it superficially resembles a graben, it is a chain of overlapping secondary craters.
