= Gerard Kuiper =

Dutch astronomer (1905–1973)

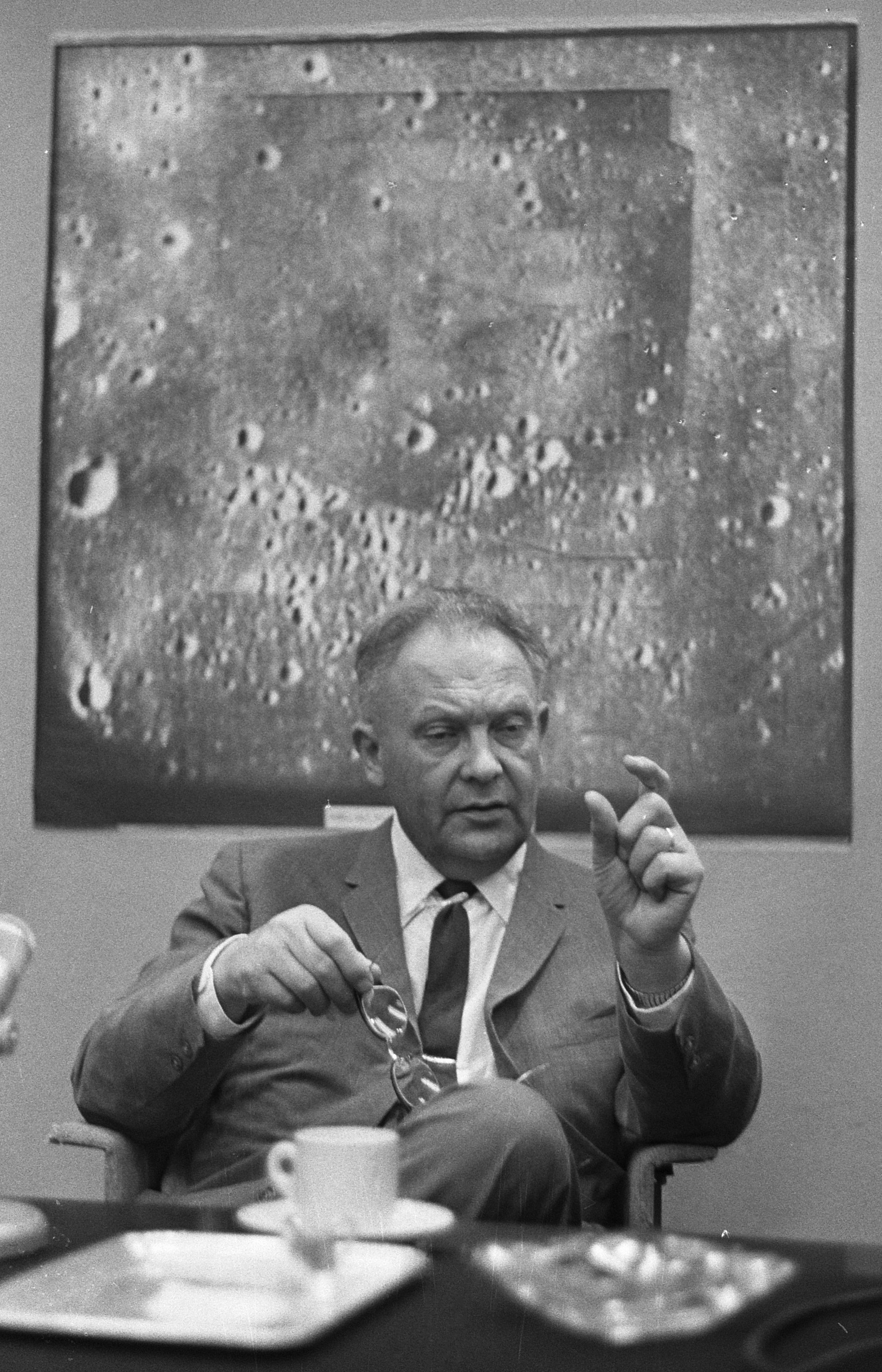
- Kuiper in 1964
- Born: Gerrit Pieter Kuiper; 7 December 1905; Tuitjenhorn, Netherlands
- Died: 23 December 1973 (aged 68); Mexico City, Mexico
- Education: Leiden University
- Occupations: Astronomer; planetary scientist; selenographer; author; professor
- Known for: Kuiper belt
- Spouse: Sarah Fuller (m. 1936)
- Scientific career
- Fields: Astronomy
- Thesis: Statistische onderzoekingen van dubbelsterren (1933)
- Doctoral students: Carl Sagan

Gerard Peter Kuiper (/ˈkaɪpər/ KY-pər; born Gerrit Pieter Kuiper, Dutch: [ˈɣɛrɪt ˈpitər ˈkœypər]; 7 December 1905 – 23 December 1973) was a Dutch astronomer, planetary scientist, selenographer, author and professor. The Kuiper belt is named after him.

Kuiper is considered by many to be the father of modern planetary science.

== Early life and education ==
Kuiper, the son of a tailor in the village of Tuitjenhorn in North Holland, had an early interest in astronomy. He had extraordinarily sharp eyesight, allowing him to see with the naked eye magnitude 7.5 stars, about four times fainter than those visible to normal eyes.

He studied at Leiden University in 1924, where at the time a very large number of astronomers had congregated. He befriended fellow students Bart Bok and Pieter Oosterhoff, and was taught by Ejnar Hertzsprung, Antonie Pannekoek, Willem de Sitter, Jan Woltjer, Jan Oort, and the physicist Paul Ehrenfest. He received his candidate degree in Astronomy in 1927 and continued straight on with his graduate studies.

Kuiper received his PhD degree from Leiden University in the Netherlands on his thesis on binary stars with Hertzsprung in 1933.

== Career ==
He traveled to California to become a fellow under Robert Grant Aitken at the Lick Observatory. In 1935 he left to work at the Harvard College Observatory, where he met Sarah Parker Fuller (1913-2000), whom he married on 20 June 1936. Although he had planned to move to Java to work at the Bosscha Observatory, he took a position at Yerkes Observatory of the University of Chicago and received American citizenship in 1937.

From 1947 to 1949, Kuiper served as the director of the Yerkes Observatory, as well as the McDonald Observatory in west Texas. In 1949, Kuiper initiated the Yerkes–McDonald asteroid survey (1950–1952).

From 1950-1960 he was professor at the University of Chicago, and from 1957 to 1959, Kuiper once again served as the director of the Yerkes and McDonald Observatories.

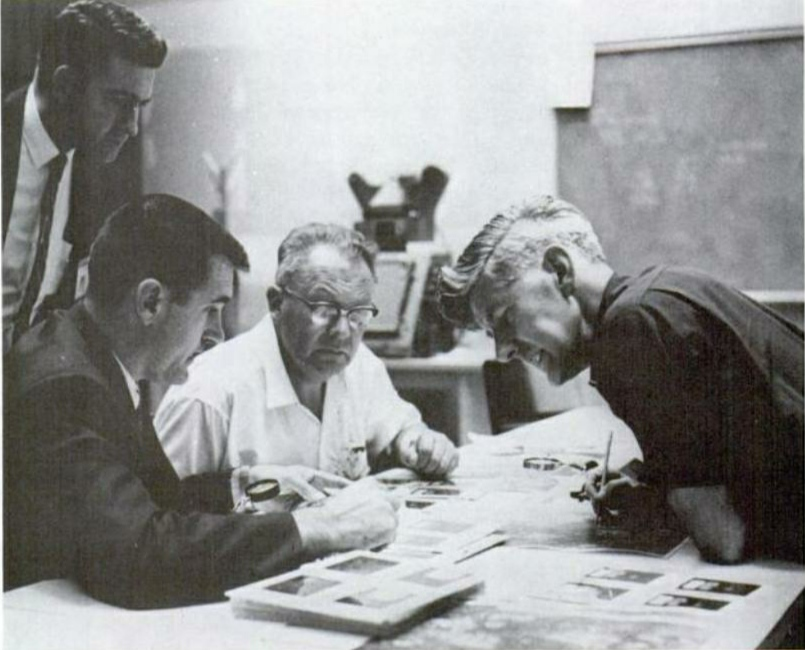
Experimenters Raymond Heacock, Kuiper, and Ewen Whitaker examine Ranger 7 pictures at the Flight Control Center

Kuiper was doctoral advisor to Carl Sagan. In 1958, the two worked on the classified military Project A119, a secret Air Force plan to detonate a nuclear warhead on the moon. In 1959, he sent Jürgen Stock to Chile, to search for suitable sites of an observatory for the Southern skies, who eventually would identify the spot for the Cerro Tololo Inter-American Observatory.

In 1960 Kuiper moved to Tucson, Arizona, to found the Lunar and Planetary Laboratory at the University of Arizona, serving as the laboratory's director for the rest of his life, until his death in 1973.

=== Discoveries ===
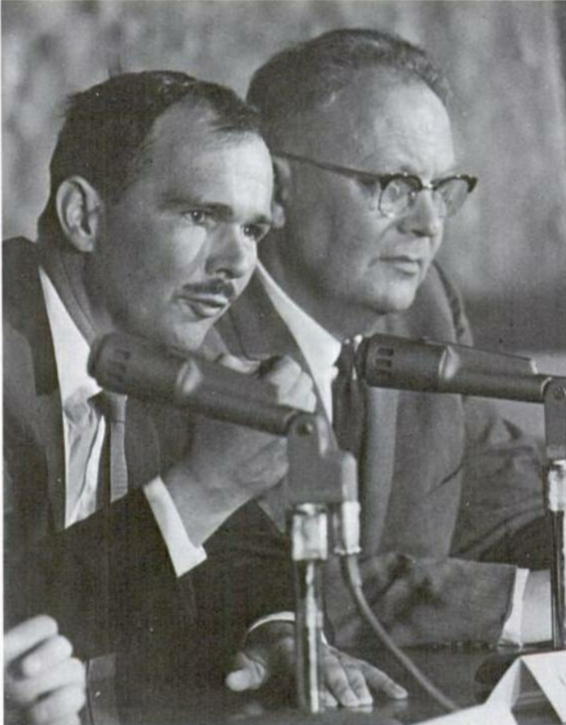
Eugene Shoemaker and Kuiper answer newsmen's questions at the Interim Scientific Results Conference of the Ranger program.

Kuiper discovered two natural satellites of planets in the Solar System, namely Uranus's satellite Miranda and Neptune's satellite Nereid. In addition, he discovered carbon dioxide in the atmosphere of Mars, and the existence of a methane-laced atmosphere above Saturn's satellite Titan in 1944. Kuiper also pioneered airborne infrared observing using a Convair 990 aircraft in the 1960s.

In the 1950s Kuiper's interdisciplinary collaboration with the geochemist and Nobel Laureate Harold C. Urey to understand the Moon's thermal evolution descended into acrimony, as the two engaged in what became known as the "Hot Moon, Cold Moon" controversy. Their falling out, in part a scientific dispute, also reflected the challenge of maintaining professional relationships across overlapping but distinct scientific disciplines.

By 1950, Kuiper had contributed a theory for the ongoing problem of solar system origins. Kuiper claimed that gravitational instabilities would form in the solar nebula, which would then condense into protoplanets. However, Kuiper's theory failed to address the angular momentum problem, simply attributing the loss of momentum to magnetic and electric fields instead of gravity.

In 1951, in a paper in Astrophysics: A Topical Symposium, Kuiper speculated that a large disc of small astronomical bodies formed early in the Solar System's evolution. He suggested that the disc consisted of "remnants of original clusterings which have lost many members that became stray asteroids, much as has occurred with open galactic clusters dissolving into stars." In another paper, based upon a lecture Kuiper gave in 1950, also called On the Origin of the Solar System, Kuiper wrote about the "outermost region of the solar nebula, from 38 to 50 astr. units (i.e., just outside proto-Neptune)" where "condensation products (ices of H_{2}O, NH_{3}, CH_{4}, etc.) must have formed, and the flakes must have slowly collected and formed larger aggregates, estimated to range up to 1 km or more in size." He continued to write that "these condensations appear to account for the comets, in size, number and composition." According to Kuiper "the planet Pluto, which sweeps through the whole zone from 30 to 50 astr. units, is held responsible for having started the scattering of the comets throughout the solar system." It is said that Kuiper was operating on the assumption, common in his time, that Pluto was the size of Earth and had therefore scattered these bodies out toward the Oort cloud or out of the Solar System; there would not be a Kuiper belt today if this were correct. The name "Kuiper belt" was given to the region in the 1980s; it was first used in print by Scott Tremaine in 1988.

In the 1960s, Kuiper helped identify landing sites on the Moon for the Apollo program. (Note: Cameras in Ranger VIII were turned on 23 minutes before impact, and the spacecraft transmitted pictures back to earth until it struck the surface and was destroyed. The flight's product would be intensively studied by a panel of noted lunar scientists, among them Gerard P. Kuiper and Ewen A. Whitaker of the University of Arizona and Harold C. Urey of the University of California. — Brooks & Ertel (1976, p. 75))

Kuiper discovered several binary stars which received "Kuiper numbers" to identify them, such as KUI 79.

== Personal life and death ==
He married Sarah Parker Fuller (1913-2000) on 20 June 1936. Kuiper died age 68 of a heart attack on 23 December 1973 in Mexico City, while on vacation with his wife.

== Honors ==
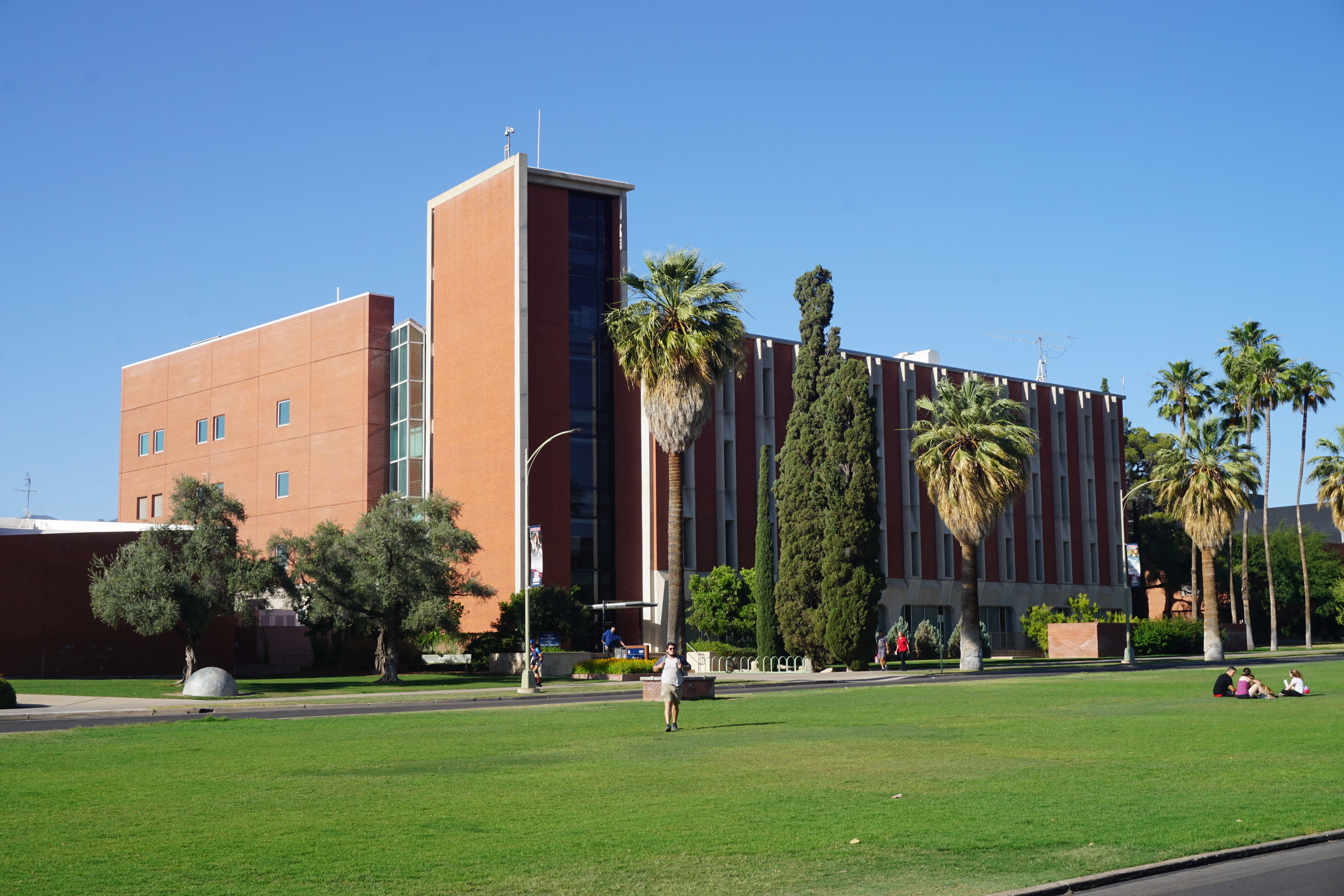
Gerard P. Kuiper Space Sciences building at the University of Arizona

- In 1951, Kuiper was awarded the Prix Jules Janssen of the Société astronomique de France (Astronomical Society of France).
- In 1959, Kuiper won the Henry Norris Russell Lectureship of the American Astronomical Society.
- In 1971, Kuiper received the Kepler Gold Medal from the American Association for the Advancement of Science and the Franklin Institute.

Besides the minor planet 1776 Kuiper, three craters (Mercurian, lunar, and Martian), Kuiper Scarp in Antarctica, and the now-decommissioned Kuiper Airborne Observatory were also named after him.

Astronomers refer to a region of minor planets beyond Neptune as the "Kuiper belt," since Kuiper had suggested that such small planets or comets may have formed there. However Kuiper himself believed that such objects would have been swept clear by planetary gravitational perturbations, so that none or few would exist there today.

The Kuiper Prize, named in his honor, is the most distinguished award given by the American Astronomical Society's Division for Planetary Sciences, an international society of professional planetary scientists. (Note: The Kuiper Prize recognizes outstanding contributors to planetary science, and is awarded annually to scientists whose lifetime achievements have most advanced our understanding of planetary systems. Winners of this award include Carl Sagan, James Van Allen, and Eugene Shoemaker.)

One of the three buildings at Arizona that makes up the Lunar and Planetary Laboratory is named in his honor.

In 2001, a statue of Kuiper designed by Gosse Dam was erected in Tuitjenjorn.

== In popular culture ==
Episode 6 ("The Man of a Trillion Worlds") of the TV series Cosmos: Possible Worlds featured the Kuiper–Urey conflict.
