= Raymond Heacock =

American aerospace engineer (1928–2016)

Raymond Leroy Heacock
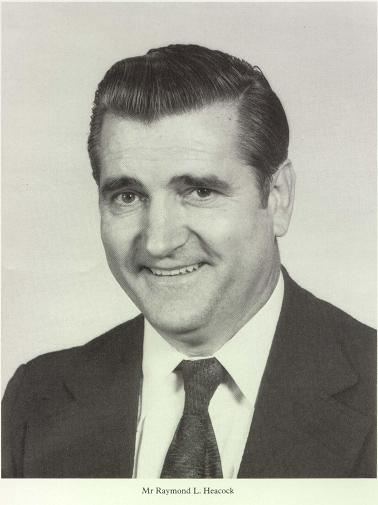
- Born: January 9, 1928; Santa Ana, California, U.S.
- Died: December 20, 2016 (aged 88); La Crescenta, California, U.S.
- Education: Caltech
- Awards: James Watt International Medal
- Scientific career
- Fields: Aerospace engineering
- Workplaces: Caltech; JPL

Raymond L. Heacock (January 9, 1928 – December 20, 2016) was an American engineer who spent his career at NASA's Jet Propulsion Laboratory where he worked on the Ranger program in the 1960s and on the Voyager program in the 1970s and 1980s. A Caltech engineering graduate, he was the winner of the James Watt International Medal for 1979.

== Education and work ==
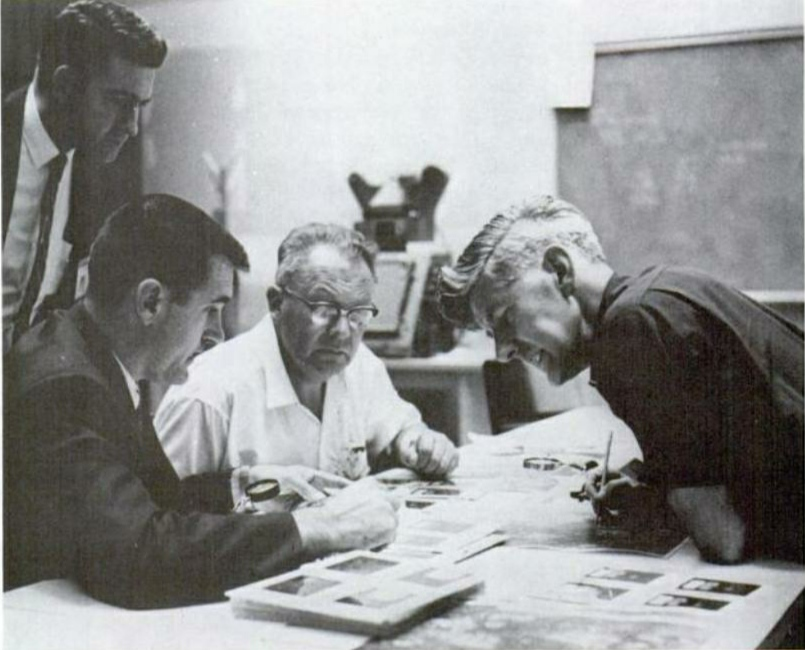
Experimenters Heacock, Gerard Kuiper, and Ewen Whitaker examine Ranger 7 pictures at the Flight Control Center

Heacock joined the Jet Propulsion Laboratory in 1953, after receiving his Master of Science Degree in Engineering from the California Institute of Technology. Prior to joining the Voyager Project in 1972 as Spacecraft Systems Manager he had advanced through various positions of responsibility at the Laboratory. In October 1977, he was appointed Deputy Manager of the Voyager Project and became Manager in 1979. He was a member of the American Institute of Aeronautics and Astronautics and has served as Secretary, Treasurer, Vice-President and President of the Board of Directors of the Caltech Alumni Association. Heacock is a native of Santa Ana, California and lived in La Crescenta.

Since the inception of the Voyager Project in 1972, Heacock was deeply involved in guiding and shaping the development and operation of the craft. The scientific data from the flight experiments carried aboard them have yielded new information on Jupiter, Saturn, and Uranus. Heacock was a leader in the design, development and flight operations of these craft as well as of their scientific instruments complement. As Spacecraft System Manager, Deputy Project Manager, and Project Manager he contributed personally to the development of various advanced design features leading to the Project's success.

NASA's two robot spacecraft, Voyager 1 and Voyager 2, were launched in the Summer of 1977 on their journeys to Jupiter of more than 625 million miles. Voyager 1 reached Saturn in November 1981, and then left the Solar System. Nearly 10 years later Voyager 1 turned around to point its cameras towards Earth and took the famous Pale Blue Dot image. Voyager 2 reached Saturn in August 1981, then went on to Uranus in 1986, and Neptune in 1989. The spacecraft reached interstellar space, becoming the first probes to do so.

== James Watt International Medal ==
The presentation of the 1979 James Watt International Medal was made on Wednesday, June 25, 1980 at the Institute of Mechanical Engineers in London. The Medal was presented to Heacock by the President of the Institution of Mechanical Engineers, Bryan Hildrew.

The James Watt International Medal is awarded biennially to an engineer of any nationality who is deemed worthy of this, the highest award which the Institution of Mechanical Engineers can bestow. The Council awarded the 1979 Medal to Heacock for his outstanding achievements as leader of the team responsible for shaping the development and execution of the technically advanced spacecraft used by the United States of America in the exploration of the outer planets of the Solar System.
