= Ewen Whitaker =

British astronomer (1922–2016)

Ewen A. Whitaker
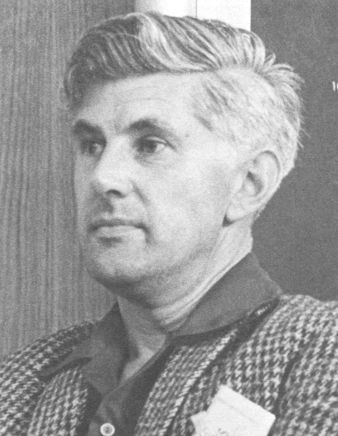
- Born: 22 June 1922; London, England
- Died: 11 October 2016 (aged 94); Tucson, Arizona, U.S.
- Occupation: Astronomer

Ewen Adair Whitaker (22 June 1922 – 11 October 2016) was a British-born astronomer known for his work in selenography and lunar cartography. Together with Gerard Kuiper, Whitaker founded the Lunar and Planetary Laboratory at the University of Arizona. He co-authored multiple moon atlases, and helped NASA to select a landing site for Apollo 12 and several Surveyor and Ranger missions.

== Early life and education ==
Ewen Adair Whitaker was born in London to George Whitaker, a typesetter, and Gladys Johnstone, a homemaker. Whitaker attended John Roan School in Greenwich on a scholarship. His interest in astronomy began at age eight when he received The Children's Encyclopedia as a Christmas gift.

== Early career ==
During World War II, Whitaker worked at Siemens Brothers as a laboratory assistant, conducting quality control for the lead sheathing of cables used in the secret Operation PLUTO (Pipeline Under The Ocean), which supplied fuel to Allied forces in France under the English Channel. This work exempted him from military service. He "mastered" spectroscopy there.

In 1946, he married Beryl Horswell, whom he met through the St Mary's youth fellowship; she also worked for Siemens. After he graduated with a certificate in mechanical engineering from Woolwich Polytechnic, his only formal academic qualification, Whitaker joined the Royal Greenwich Observatory in 1949. Initially he worked on the UV spectra of stars, but soon switched to the lunar studies. He became the Director of the Lunar Section of the British Astronomical Association (BAA) and Fellow of the Royal Astronomical Society (RAS).

Whitaker later recalled that he was almost the only one interested in the Moon, while others were interested in galaxies: "'That darn Moon puts a light up in the sky at night so we can’t take long exposure pictures of our faint galaxies.' ... The Moon was just a dead lump of rock that everyone knows about."

== Lunar research ==
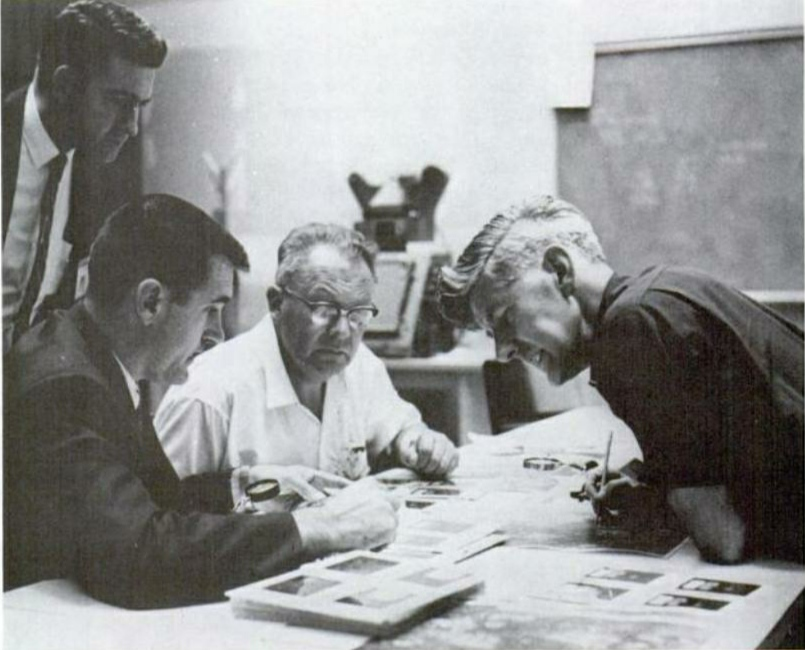
Experimenters Raymond Heacock, Gerard Kuiper, and Whitaker examine Ranger 7 pictures at the Flight Control Center

In 1955, Whitaker attended an International Astronomical Union meeting in Dublin where he met Gerard Kuiper. When Kuiper requested assistance with creating a lunar atlas, Whitaker was the only one among 400 astronomers to respond. He joined Kuiper's Lunar Project at Yerkes Observatory in Wisconsin on October 5, 1957—coincidentally a day after Sputnik 1 was launched by the USSR. In 1958, he permanently moved to the US with his family. His colleague from BAA, David W. Arthur, also joined Kuiper's lab. He was particularly interested in "lunar crater typology and distribution". Whitaker used 40-inch telescope of the Yerkes Observatory, 82-inch one of the McDonald Observatory to get photos for the Photographic Lunar Atlas, published in 1960.

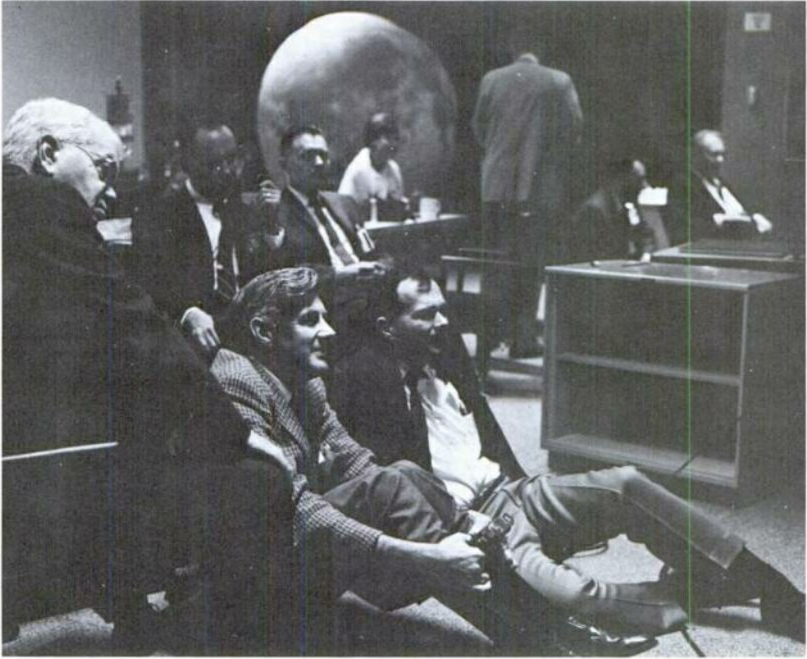
Harold Urey, Whitaker, and Eugene Shoemaker, in foreground, watch Ranger 9 pictures "Live" at the Flight Control Center

In 1960, Whitaker moved with Kuiper to the University of Arizona, where they established the Lunar and Planetary Laboratory (LPL). There, he was the first to apply "the Zwicky technique of differential UV/IR photography to the moon", a technique combining ultraviolet and infrared photography to map the Moon's chemical composition, which proved valuable for selecting Apollo landing sites. He worked at the LPL until his retirement in 1987. He used LPL's 61-inch telescope for the Consolidated Lunar Atlas, published in 1967.

Whitaker was considered to be the world's leading expert on lunar mapping and nomenclature. According to Timothy Swindle, director of the LPL, "[Whitaker] knew more about what was where on the Moon than any previous human being in history ever had". He was a member of the IAU's Task Group for Lunar Nomenclature. Together with David W. Arthur, he created a new way to name lunar features; later he created a "lettering system for designating unnamed craters". It was adopted by the IAU in 2006, together with a list of letters for nearside craters which he compiled together with L. E. Anderson in 1982.

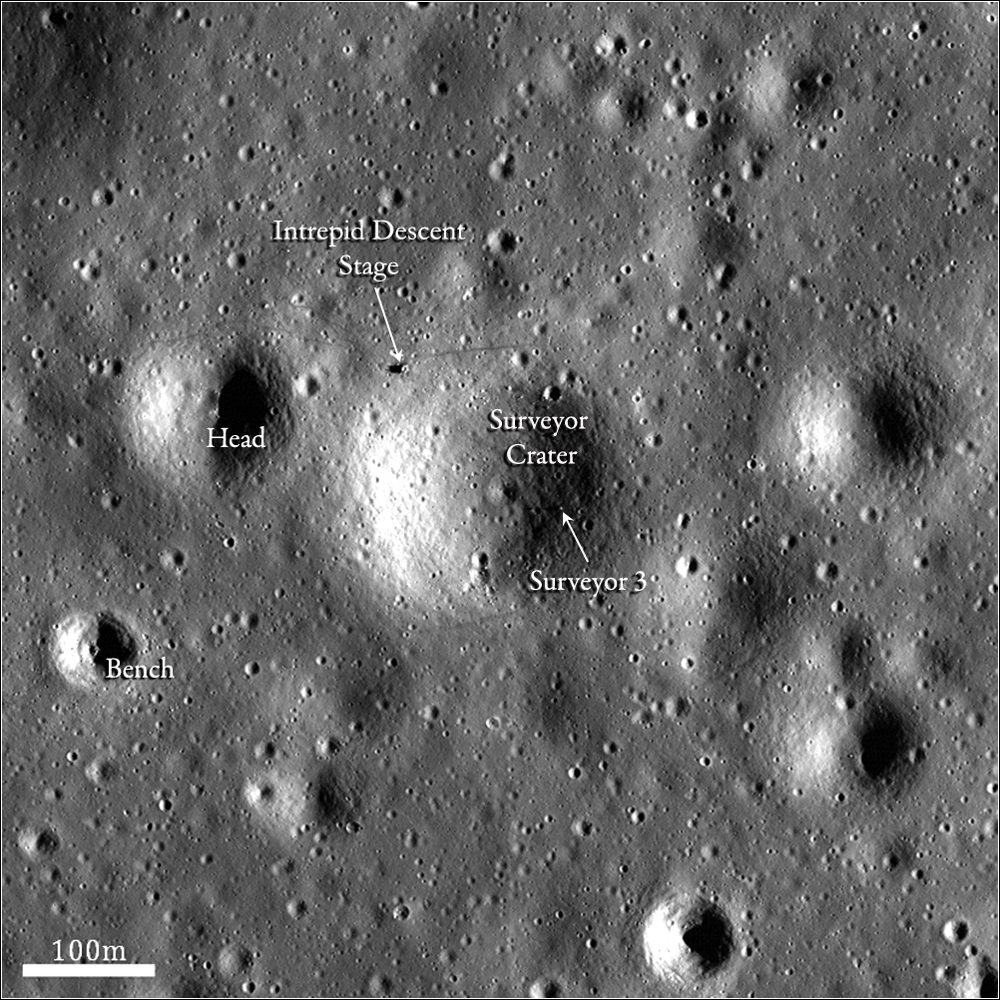
Apollo 12 landing site (see more on Commons)

Whitaker's most notable achievement was locating the precise landing site for Apollo 12. After he found the Surveyor 1 landing site with better precision than NASA, he was invited to locate Surveyor 3. By studying images from Surveyor 3 and comparing them with photographs of thousands of similar craters under the microscope, he identified two rocks near the spacecraft. This led to designation of a landing site for Apollo 12, where astronauts will be able to reach the earlier probe. The mission succeeded, with astronauts landing within 600 feet of Surveyor 3. Whitaker himself described the search for Surveyor 3 as "the hunting of the snark".

Whitaker also worked in landing sites selection for Ranger and Surveyor missions; briefed astronauts for Apollo missions 13, 15, and 16; located impact sites for Rangers 7 and 9 and Saturn rocket stages from Apollo missions; and developed new systems for naming lunar features, particularly on the far side of the Moon. He chose 14 farside craters to commemorate the Challenger and Columbia astronauts.

Whitaker also calculated the orbital eccentricity and inclination of Miranda, Uranus's fifth satellite, made possible by a simple plate-measuring method that he devised and which gave a tenfold increase in precision (from plates taken decades earlier).

== Later years ==
After retiring from the University of Arizona in 1987, Whitaker remained active in lunar studies. He published Mapping and Naming the Moon: A History of Lunar Cartography and Nomenclature in 1999. Among his other achievements was determining the precise dates of Galileo's lunar observations from 1609 and 1610, published in his Sidereus Nuncius.

Long after his retirement, made contributions to the history of the telescope, constructing an instrument built to a 16th-century design attributed to Leonard Digges capable of producing magnified wide-field images.

Whitaker collected lunar maps and had a "lifelong passion for repairing broken clocks". He also built a harpsichord in his spare time.

He died in Tucson, Arizona, on October 11, 2016, at age 94. He was predeceased by his wife Beryl in 2013 and survived by their three children: Fiona, Malcolm, and Graham.

== Awards and recognition ==
Whitaker received multiple honors, including:

- A personal commendation from President Nixon for locating Surveyor 3
- The Walter Goodacre Medal from the British Astronomical Association (1982)
- Asteroid 7948 was named "Whitaker" in his honor
- An honorary doctorate by the University of Arizona (2011)

== Selected publications ==
- Arthur, D. W. G.; Moore, E.; Tapscott, J. W.; Whitaker, E. A. (1960). Kuiper, G. P. (ed.). Photographic Lunar Atlas. University of Chicago Press.
- Arthur, D. W. G.; Whitaker, E. A. (1960). Kuiper, G. P. (ed.). Orthographic Atlas of the Moon. Tucson: University of Arizona Press.
- Hartmann, W. K.; Kuiper, G. P.; Spradley, L. H.; Whitaker, E. A. (1963). Rectified lunar atlas - supplement number two to the photographic lunar atlas.
- Kuiper, Gerard P.; Whitaker, Ewen A.; Strom, Robert G.; Fountain, John W.; Larson, Stephen M. (1967). Consolidated Lunar Atlas. Lunar and Planetary Laboratory, University of Arizona.
- Gutschewski, G. L.; Kinsler, D. C.; Whitaker, E. (1971). Atlas and gazetteer of the near side of the moon (Report).
- Whitaker, Ewen A. (1972). "Lunar color boundaries and their relationship to topographic features: A preliminary survey". The Moon. 4 (3): 348–355. doi:10.1007/BF00562002. ISSN 1573-0794.
- Whitaker, E. A.; Greenberg, R. J. (1973). "Eccentricity and inclination of Miranda's orbit". Royal Astronomical Society.
- Whitaker, Ewan A. (1978). "Galileo's Lunar Observations and the Dating of the Composition of Sidereus Nuncius". Journal for the History of Astronomy. 9 (3): 155–169. Bibcode:1978JHA.....9..155W. doi:10.1177/002182867800900301. ISSN 0021-8286.
- Andersson, L. A.; Whitaker, E. A. (1982). NASA catalogue of lunar nomenclature (Report).
- Whitaker, Ewen A. (1985). Lunar and Planetary Laboratory: Its Founding and Early Years. The University of Arizona.
- Melosh, H. J.; Whitaker, E. A. (1994). "Lunar crater chains". Nature. 369 (6483): 713–714. doi:10.1038/369713a0.
- Whitaker, Ewen A. (2003). Mapping and Naming the Moon: A History of Lunar Cartography and Nomenclature. Cambridge University Press. ISBN 978-0-521-54414-6.
- Whitaker, Ewen A. (2009a). "Representations and Maps of the Moon. The First Two Centuries.". Galileo. Images of the Universe from Antiquity to the Telescope. Florenz: Ausstellungskatalog (Hg.: Paolo Galluzzi). pp. 254–261.
- Whitaker, E. A. (2009b). "Letter to the Editor: The Digges-Bourne telescope revisited". Journal of the British Astronomical Association. 119: 64–65. Bibcode:2009JBAA..119...64W. ISSN 0007-0297.
