= Hiroshige (crater) =

Crater on Mercury

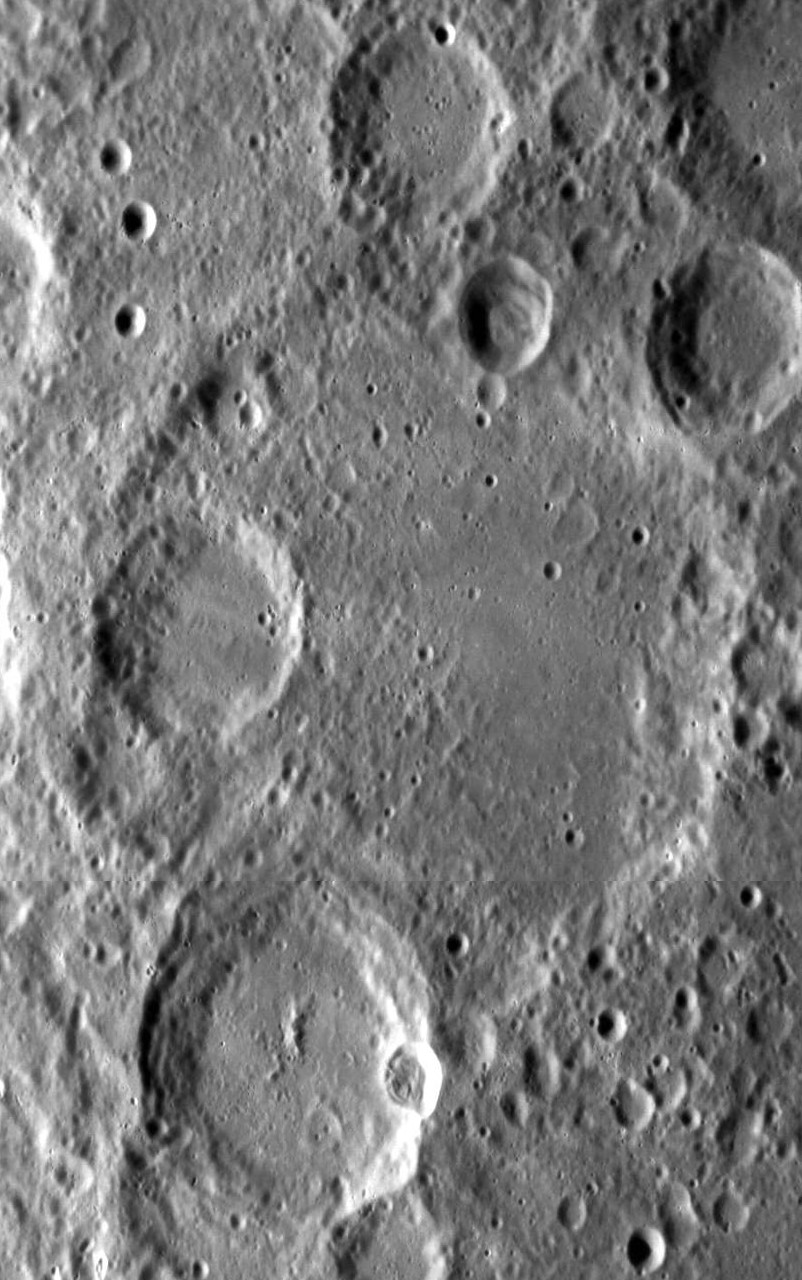
- MESSENGER mosaic of Hiroshige
- Feature type: Impact crater
- Location: Kuiper quadrangle, Mercury
- Coordinates: 13.34°S 26.96°W
- Diameter: 138 km
- Eponym: Andō Hiroshige

Hiroshige is a crater on Mercury. Its name was adopted by the International Astronomical Union (IAU) in 1976, after the Japanese artist Andō Hiroshige.

Hiroshige is east of the craters Murasaki and Kuiper. Kuiper's rays overlie Hiroshige.
