= Diarmuid Downs =

British automotive engineer

Sir Diarmuid Downs CBE KSG FRS FREng FIMechE

Managing Director, Ricardo Consulting Engineers
- In office 1967–1984

Personal details
- Born: 23 April 1922 London, England
- Died: 12 February 2014 (aged 91)

Sir Diarmuid Downs (23 April 1922 – 12 February 2014) was a British automotive engineer.

== Early life ==
Downs was born in 1922 in London, where his father ran a small engineering business manufacturing equipment for the oil industry. Downs was educated at Gunnersbury Catholic Grammar School and the Regent Street Polytechnic, London. He then studied at Northampton Engineering College, London, where he graduated with First Class honours in 1942. He won a postgraduate bursary for further research and study, which he took up with Ricardo and Co.

== Career ==
For his first 15 years with Ricardo & Co., first as student, then as a member of staff, and from 1947 as Head of the Petrol Engine Department, Downs pursued a study of fundamental study of abnormal combustion phenomena in the petrol engine, resulting in a clearer understanding of the problems of knock and pre-ignition.

Downs was made a Director of Ricardo in 1957. He was made managing director ten years later, remaining in this position until 1984. He was chairman of the company from 1976 to 1987.

Downs served as President of the Institution of Mechanical Engineers in 1978 and as President of FISITA, the International Federation of Automotive Engineering Societies, from 1978 to 1980. He was elected a Fellow of the Royal Society in 1985. He was elected a Fellow for the Royal Academy of Engineering.

More details can be found in the Bibliographical Memoirs of Fellows of The Royal Society published in 2019.

Professional and academic associations
Preceded by Hugh Ford	President of the Institution of Mechanical Engineers; 1978	Succeeded by James Gordon Dawson
