= Hugh Ford (engineer) =

- Born: 16 July 1913
- Died: 28 May 2010 (aged 96)
- Education: Imperial College London
- Spouse(s): Wynyard Scholfield (1942–1991); Thelma Jensen (since 1993)
- Awards: Fellow of the Royal Society; James Watt International Medal; FREng
- Scientific career
- Workplaces: Imperial Chemical Industries; Imperial College London; Great Western Railway

Sir Hugh Ford FREng FRS (16 July 1913 – 28 May 2010) was a British engineer. He was Professor of Applied Mechanics at Imperial College London from 1951 to 1978.

== Education ==
Ford was educated at Northampton Grammar School and served an apprenticeship at the Great Western Railway. He studied at City & Guilds College (Imperial College London) on a Whitworth scholarship, where earned a first-class degree, and won the Bramwell Medal. He earned a PhD in heat transfer and fluid flow. During World War II, he worked at Imperial Chemical Industries in Cheshire. He studied operations at strip mills, earning the Thomas Hawksley Gold Medal in 1948.

== Career ==
Beginning in 1948, he was Reader in Applied Mechanics at Imperial College. He was president of the Institution of Mechanical Engineers from 1977 to 1978. Ford was elected a Fellow of the Royal Society in 1967 and knighted in 1975. In 1970, he received the A. A. Griffith Medal and Prize. He was awarded an honorary degree (Doctor of Science) from the University of Bath in 1978. In 1985 he received the James Watt International Medal.

Shortly after his death Ford was featured on the BBC Radio 4 obituary program Last Word.

Professional and academic associations
Preceded by Ewen McEwen	President of the Institution of Mechanical Engineers; 1977	Succeeded by Diarmuid Downs
