= Claude Gibb =

South Australian engineer (1898–1959)

Sir Claude Dixon Gibb KBE FRS
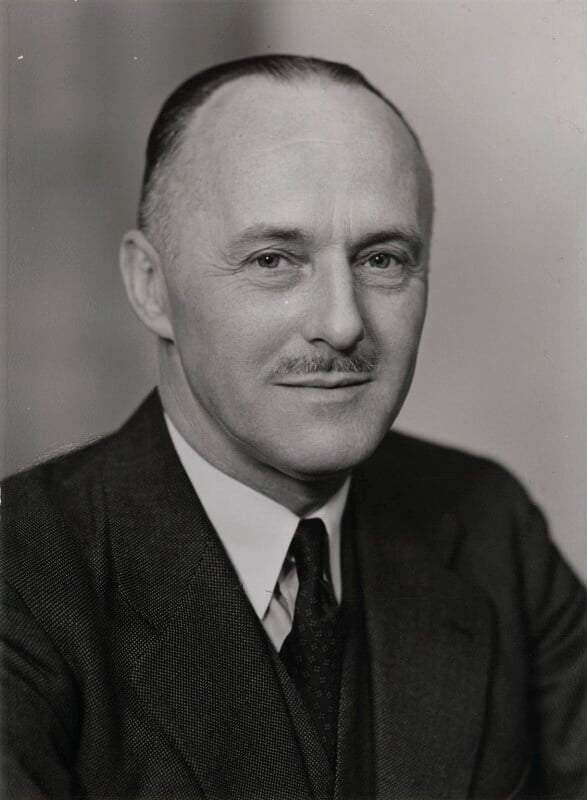
- Gibb in 1949
- Born: 29 June 1898; Alberton, South Australia
- Died: 15 January 1959 (aged 60); Newark, New Jersey, United States

Sir Claude Dixon Gibb KBE FRS (29 June 1898 – 15 January 1959) was a South Australian engineer with a considerable career in Great Britain.

== History ==
Gibb was born in Queenstown, South Australia, a son of John Gilbert Gibb (1867–1935) and his wife Caroline Elizabeth Gibb, née Dixon (1868 – 10 December 1946) of New Street, Queenstown, later of Prince Street, Alberton. He was educated at Alberton Primary School and LeFevre High School, where he won a scholarship to the South Australian School of Mines and Industries, where he studied mechanical engineering and won a gold medal.

He was apprenticed as an electrical mechanic to Gibb & Miller, engineers of Port Road, Port Adelaide. He had served three years (another reference has him working for the Adelaide Cement Company at this time) when he enlisted with the 2nd AIF on 5 December 1917, and posted to the Australian Flying Corps, a unit of the Royal Air Force which saw action in France. He was promoted to 2nd Lieutenant, appointment terminated in July 1919 with cessation of hostilities. He took his mechanical and electrical engineering diploma at the School of Mines in 1922 and began lecturing there, then transferred to the University of Adelaide and earned his BE degree in 1923 under Sir Robert Chapman, whom he named "'the greatest teacher there has ever been in engineering". On the basis of his thesis he won an Angas Engineering Scholarship at the University of Adelaide in 1924, which entitled him to £500 and two years of study abroad. He was awarded a master's degree in 1927.

In January 1924, Gibb left Adelaide to work as a fitter at £2 15/ a week in the Newcastle-on-Tyne works of C. A. Parsons Ltd. Less than five years later he was Parsons' chief engineer and a director.

In 1941, Lord Beaverbrook appointed him Director-General of Weapons in the Ministry of Supply in charge, under Admiral Sir Harold Brown, Director General of Munitions Production, of 3,000 engineering firms and 250,000 workers. Under his direction British output of munitions and war materiel increased significantly. In 1943, he became Director-General of Armoured Fighting Vehicles, which against opposition assumed full responsibility for tank design, resulting in the Centurion tank. He also designed the stabilized 17-pounder gun fitted to Sherman tanks.

His largest business connection apart from Parsons' was the chairmanship of A. Reyrolle and Co., at the time the largest switchgear manufacturer in the world.

== Family ==
Gibb married Margaret Harris in Devon, England, on 26 December 1925.

Gibb had two brothers and one sister:

- Alfred John Gibb (1892–1959), managing director of the engineering firm Gibb & Miller
- William George Gibb (1891–1961), of the carrying firm of W. & R. Gibb
- Vera Jessie Gibb (1904–1992), married Ewen McIntyre Waterman (1901–1982) in 1928

== Recognition ==
- He was awarded an honorary Doctor of Science of Durham University
- He was awarded a Doctor of Science in Engineering by London University
- He was awarded a CBE, in 1942 in recognition of his work for the war effort
- He was knighted in the 1945 New Year Honours.
- He was elected a Fellow of the Royal Society in 1946, an unusual honor for an engineer
- He was a vice-president of the Institution of Mechanical Engineers
- He was a vice-president of the Engineering section of the British Association
- He gave the first Robin Memorial Lecture at the University of Adelaide, in memory of Prof. Roland. C. Robin (1889–1951)
- Awarded James Watt International Gold Medal 1959
- His name is commemorated by a bronze plaque on North Terrace, Adelaide.
- High-rise halls of residence at Newcastle Polytechnic (now the University of Northumbria) were named for him following their construction in 1965.
