= James Watt International Gold Medal =

British award for mechanical engineering

The James Watt Medal is an award for excellence in engineering established in 1937, conferred by the Institution of Mechanical Engineers in the United Kingdom. It is named after Scottish engineer James Watt (1736–1819) who developed the Watt steam engine in 1781, which was fundamental to the changes brought by the Industrial Revolution in both his native Great Britain and the rest of the world.

== James Watt International Gold Medal of the Institution of Mechanical Engineers ==
The James Watt International Gold Medal of the IMechE

The James Watt International Gold Medal is awarded by the British to an outstanding mechanical engineer.

To commemorate the bicentenary of the birth of James Watt on 19 January 1736 - an event which was destined to bring about a revolution in the utilisation of power - the Institution of Mechanical Engineers award every two years a Gold Medal to an engineer of any nationality who is deemed worthy of the highest award the Institution can bestow and that a mechanical engineer can receive. In making the award, the Institution has sought the co-operation and advice of engineering Institutions and Societies in all parts of the world.

To be worthy to receive a medal struck in commemoration of one who was at one and the same time a scientist, an inventor and a producer, the recipient himself should be an engineer who has achieved international recognition both by his works as a mechanical engineer and by the ability with which he has applied science to the progress of mechanical engineering.

Recipients of the James Watt International Gold Medal are:

Year	Recipient	Nominated by	Achievement
1937	Sir John Aspinall	The Institution of Mechanical Engineers	Locomotive designer
1939	Henry Ford	American Society of Mechanical Engineers	
1941	Professor Aurel Stodola	Swiss Society of Engineers and Architects, Czechoslovakia Society of Engineers, Engineering Institute of Canada	Steam turbine engineer
1943	Anthony Michell	Institution of Engineers, Australia, South African Institute of Engineers, Engineering Institute of Canada	
1945	Dr Frederick Lanchester	Institution of Mechanical Engineers	
1947	Professor Stephen Timoshenko	Swiss Society of Mechanical Engineers and Architects	
1949	Dr Fredrik Ljungström	Swedish Society of Engineers	
1951	Dr Hans Henrik Blache	Danish Society of Engineers	
1953	Sir Harry Ricardo	Institution of Mechanical Engineers	
1955	Dr Igor Sikorsky	American Society of Engineers	
1957	Professor Walther Bauersfeld	Verein Deutscher Ingenieure	
1959	Sir Claude Gibb	Institution of Engineers, Australia, Institution of Mechanical Engineers	
1961	Professor Dr Theodore von Karman	American Society of Engineers	
1963	Sir William Stanier	Institution of Mechanical Engineers	English mechanical engineer and locomotive designer
1965	Professor Sir Geoffrey Taylor	Institution of Mechanical Engineers	
1967	Academician Ivan Ivanovitch Artobolevskii	Academy of Sciences of the USSR	
1969	Dr Hideo Shima	Japan Society of Mechanical Engineers	Chief engineer of Tōkaidō Shinkansen high speed train
1971	Dr Robert R. Gilruth	American Society of Mechanical Engineers	
1973	The Rt Hon the Lord Hinton of Bankside	Swiss Society of Engineers and Architects	
1975	Professor Dr-Ing Siegfried Meurer	Verein Deutscher Ingenieure	
1977	Air Commodore Sir Frank Whittle	New Zealand Institution of Engineers	
1979	Raymond Heacock	American Society of Mechanical Engineers	
1981	Professor J. P. Den Hartog	Institution of Mechanical Engineers	Professor emeritus and former head of the department of mechanical engineering at the Massachusetts Institute of Technology
1983	Sir Christopher Cockerell	Institution of Mechanical Engineers	
1985	Sir Hugh Ford	Institution of Mechanical Engineers	
1987	Sir Denis Rooke	Institution of Mechanical Engineers	
1989	John E Steiner	Fellowship of Engineering	
1991	Soichiro Honda	Japan Society of Mechanical Engineers	
1993	Frédéric d'Allest	Comitedes Applications Académie des Sciences, France	Aero and space engineer, head of ISAE and Arianespace
1995	Eiji Toyoda	Japan Society of Mechanical Engineers	
1997	Sydney Gillibrand	Institution of Mechanical Engineers	
1999	Professor Sir Bernard Crossland	Institution of Engineers of Ireland	
2001	Professor Duncan Dowson	Institution of Mechanical Engineers	
2003	Sir Ralph Robins	Institution of Mechanical Engineers	
2005	Leroy 'Skip' Fletcher	American Society of Mechanical Engineers	
2008	Professor Emeritus John Spence	Institution of Mechanical Engineers	
2010	Professor Roger Morgan Goodall	Institution of Mechanical Engineers	
2012	Sir Sze-yuen Chung	Institution of Mechanical Engineers	
2014	Professor Richard Parry-Jones	Institution of Mechanical Engineer	
2016	Professor Dame Ann Dowling	Institution of Mechanical Engineers	
2019	Sir David McMurtry	Institution of Mechanical Engineers	For a lifelong emphasis on research and development
2021	Prof. Emeritus Izhak Etsion	Technion - Israel Institute of Technology	For outstanding contributions in the field of Tribology

== James Watt Medal of the Institution of Civil Engineers ==
The James Watt Medal of the ICE

The James Watt Medal is also a lesser known award of the British Institution of Civil Engineers (ICE) for energy engineers.

From the Institution of Civil Engineers website:

The James Watt Medal is awarded for papers having a substantial mechanical engineering content. The medal, named after James Watt, the Scottish mechanical engineer and inventor who died in 1819, was introduced by Robert Stephenson (President of ICE in 1855-1856) who recommended Council to acquire the dies of the medal from Joseph S Wyon in 1858.

Recipients of the James Watt Medal of the Institution of Civil Engineers include:

- 1880s? Basil Wood for his work on Combined Heat and Power
- 2000 Paul Kassabian. Structural engineer with interests in design, dynamic control, and deployable structures.
- 2000 Professor Sergio Pellegrino. Professor of Structural Engineering at the University of Cambridge. Specializes in deployable lightweight structures.
- 2005 Choo Yoo Sang, J W Boh, and L Louca.
- 2009 Dick Fenner and Joan Ko for "Adoption of energy efficiency innovations in new UK housing"
- 2010 Neil Chapman for paper on radioactive waste disposal
- 2014 Malcolm Joyce
- 2019 Tobias Lühn and Jutta Geldermann for "Optimising power grids using batteries and fuzzy control of photovoltaic generation"

== See also ==
- List of engineering awards
- List of mechanical engineering awards
