= Kuiper (Mercurian crater) =

Crater on Mercury

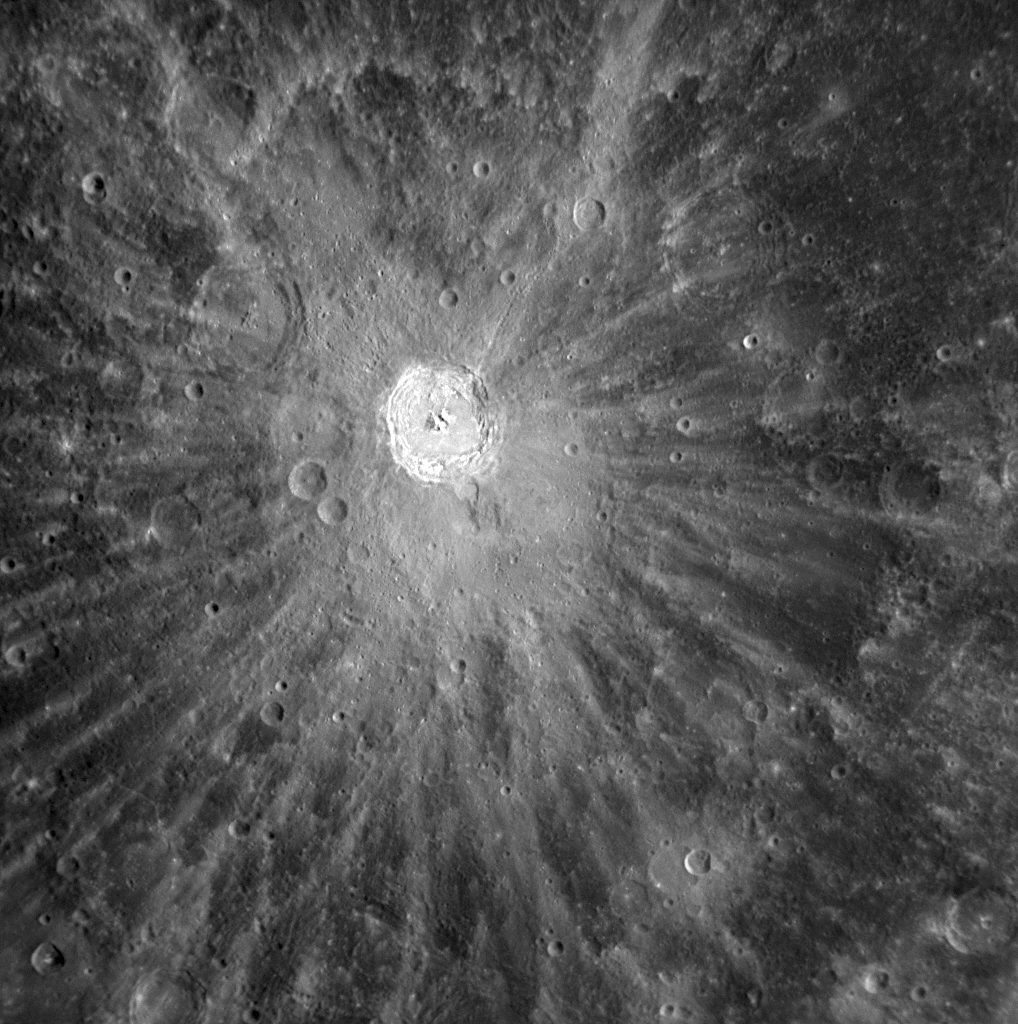
- Kuiper photographed by MESSENGER
- Feature type: Impact crater
- Location: Kuiper quadrangle, Mercury
- Coordinates: 11.35°S 31.23°W
- Diameter: 62 km (39 mi)
- Eponym: Gerard Kuiper

Kuiper is a moderate-size crater with a central peak cluster located at 11.35°S 31.23°W on Mercury. It is 62 kilometers in diameter and was named after Dutch-American astronomer Gerard Kuiper in 1976. It is one of only 2 Mercurian craters which are named not after artists, and one of very few cases when the same name is used for 3 craters (there are also Kuiper craters on Mars and on the Moon). Gerard Kuiper, being a leader of American planetary science, died shortly before the first images of Mercurian surface were made.

Kuiper overlies the northern rim of the larger crater Murasaki. Kuiper crater has the highest recorded albedo of any region on the planet's surface and has a prominent ray system, suggesting that it is one of the youngest craters.

Kuiper is one of the largest craters of the Kuiperian system on Mercury. The largest is Bartók crater. The Kuiperian time period is named after Kuiper crater.

== Views ==
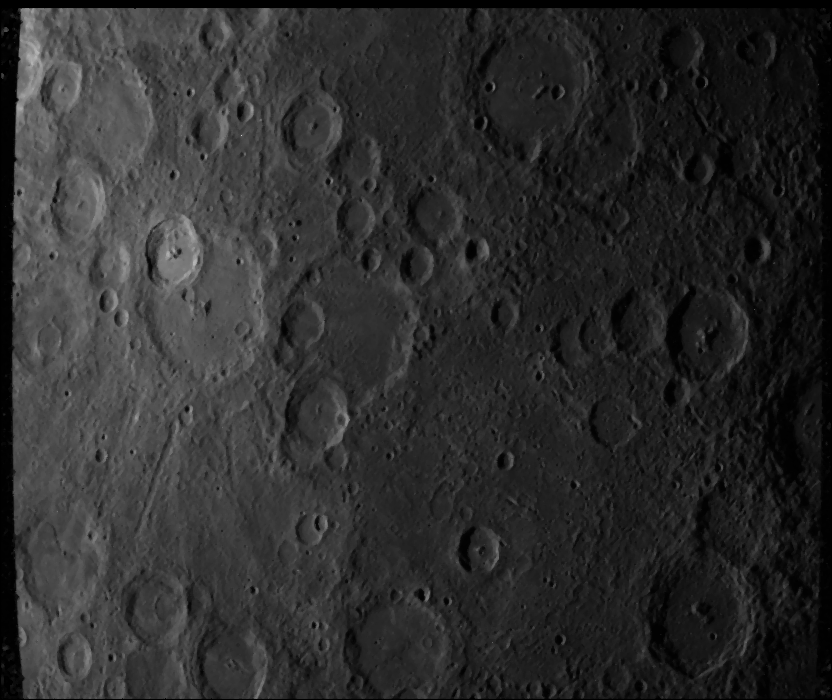
Mariner 10 image with Kuiper at left

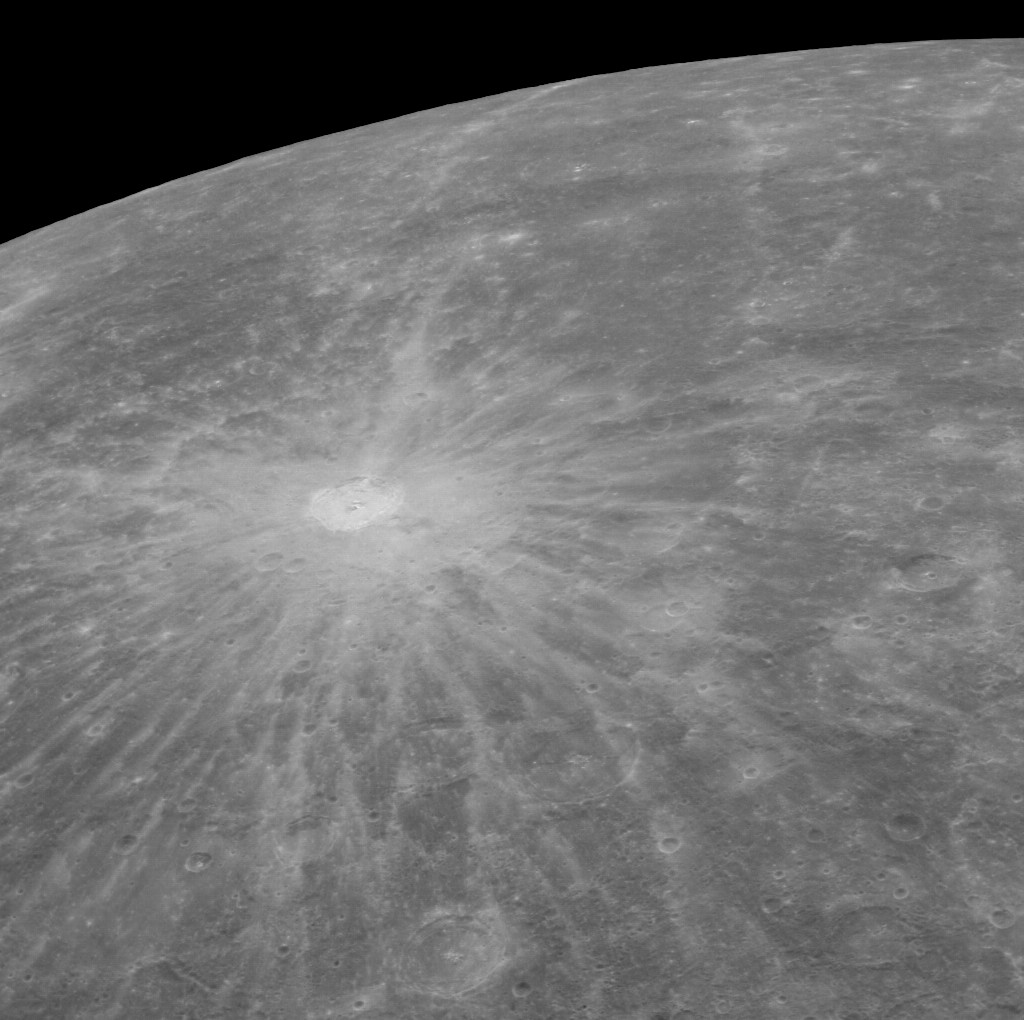
Distant oblique view from MESSENGER showing the extent of the ray system

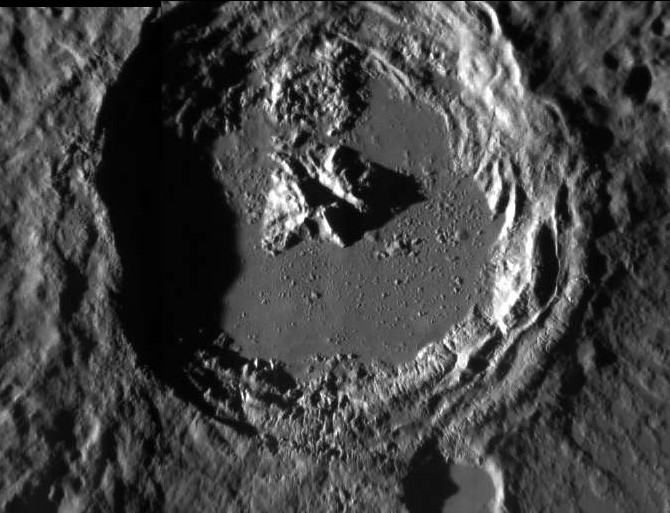
Kuiper crater at low sun angle

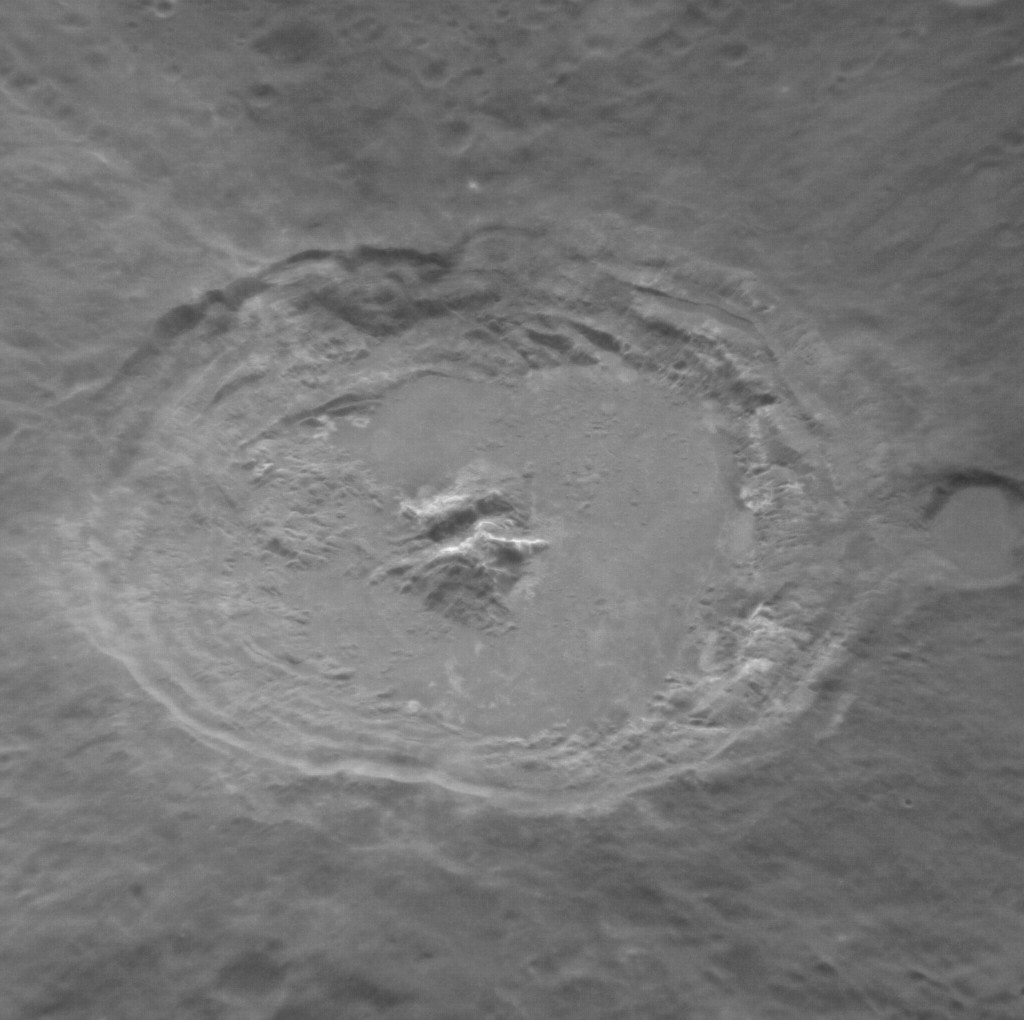
Oblique view at high sun angle

== Links ==
- Map of the region with current names of surface features
