= Pieter Oosterhoff =

Dutch astronomer (1904–1978)

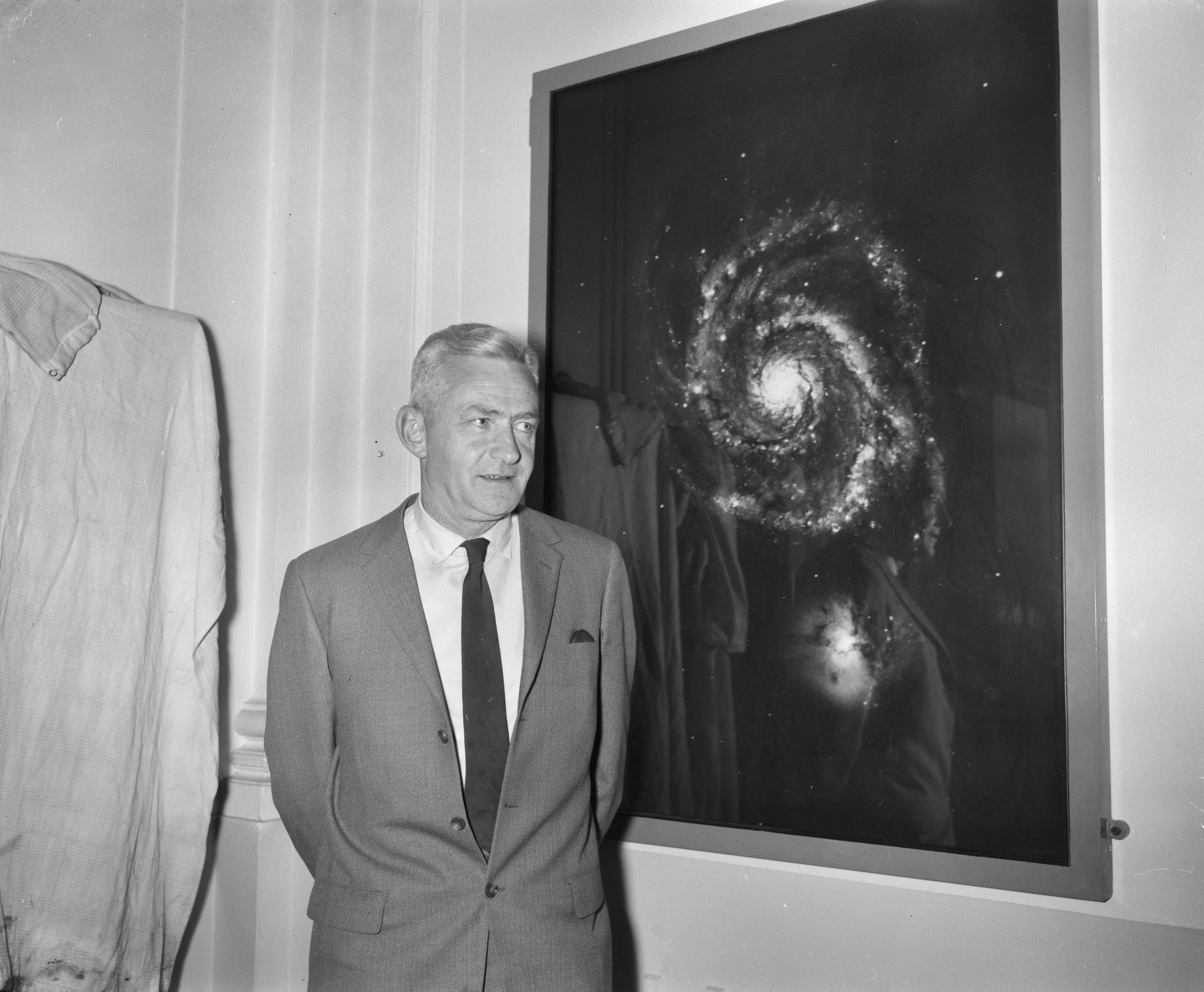
Oosterhoff (1961)

Pieter Theodorus Oosterhoff (30 March 1904, Leeuwarden - 14 March 1978, Leiden) was a Dutch astronomer.

He was the co-administrator, along with Jan Oort, of the Leiden Observatory in the Netherlands.

His published papers are primarily in regard to variable stars and photometry. He is most noted for his 1939 observation that there appear to be two populations of globular clusters based on the periodicities of their RR Lyrae variable stars. These two populations would come to be known as Oosterhoff groups after him.

Between 1951 and 1952 he served as assistant general secretary of the International Astronomical Union, and served as general secretary from 1952 until 1958. In 1954 he was one of twelve European astronomers who drafted a statement that would lead to the formation of the ESO.

The asteroid 1738 Oosterhoff is named after him.
