= Kuiper (lunar crater) =

Crater on the Moon

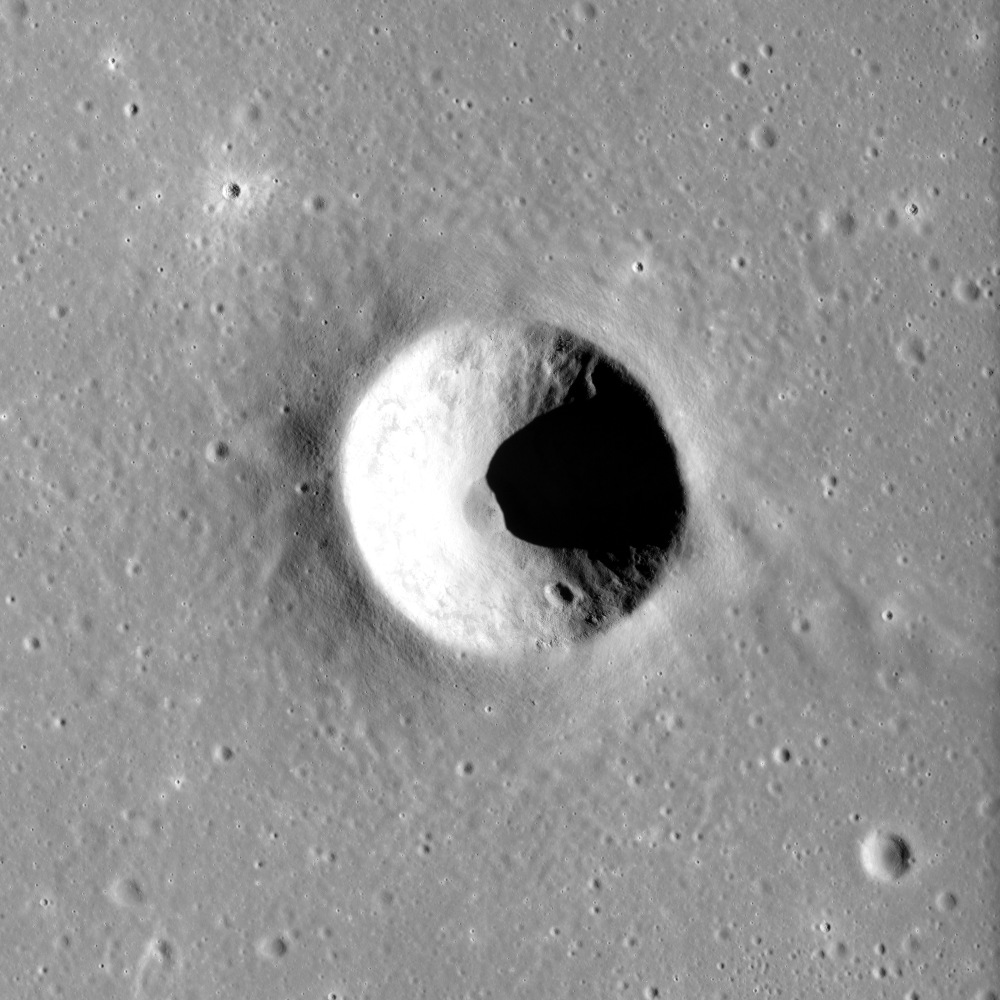
- Apollo 16 image
- Coordinates: 9.8°S 22.7°W
- Diameter: 7 km
- Depth: 1.3 km
- Colongitude: 23° at sunrise
- Eponym: Gerard P. Kuiper

Kuiper (/ˈkaɪpər/ KY-pər) is a small lunar impact crater in a relatively featureless part of the Mare Cognitum. On the lunar geologic timescale, this formation dates to the Copernican period. It is a circular, cup-shaped feature with only some minor wear. The lava-flooded crater Bonpland lies to the east at the edge of the Mare Cognitum.

This crater was named after Dutch-American astronomer Gerard Kuiper in 1976. Kuiper was the Project Scientist for the Ranger program. It was previously identified as Bonpland E.

To the east-southeast of Kuiper crater is the crash landing site of the Ranger 7 probe, the first American spacecraft to make high resolution close-up photographs of the Moon.
