= Murasaki (crater) =

Crater on Mercury

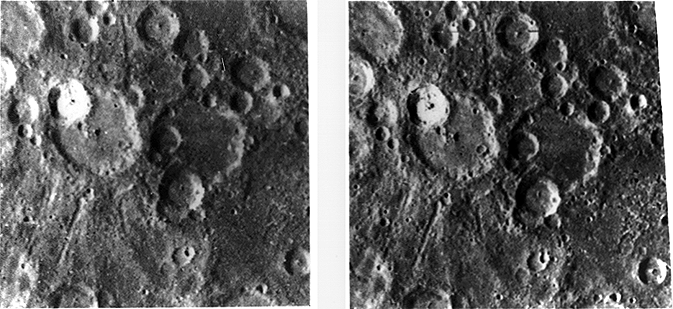
- Mariner 10 stereo images of Murasaki and Hiroshige craters. The image on the left was taken during the second flyby, that on the right at the first. The 125 km diameter Murasaki is on the left, and 140 km Hiroshige on the right
- Feature type: Impact crater
- Location: Kuiper quadrangle, Mercury
- Coordinates: 12°S 31°W
- Diameter: 132 km
- Eponym: Murasaki Shikibu

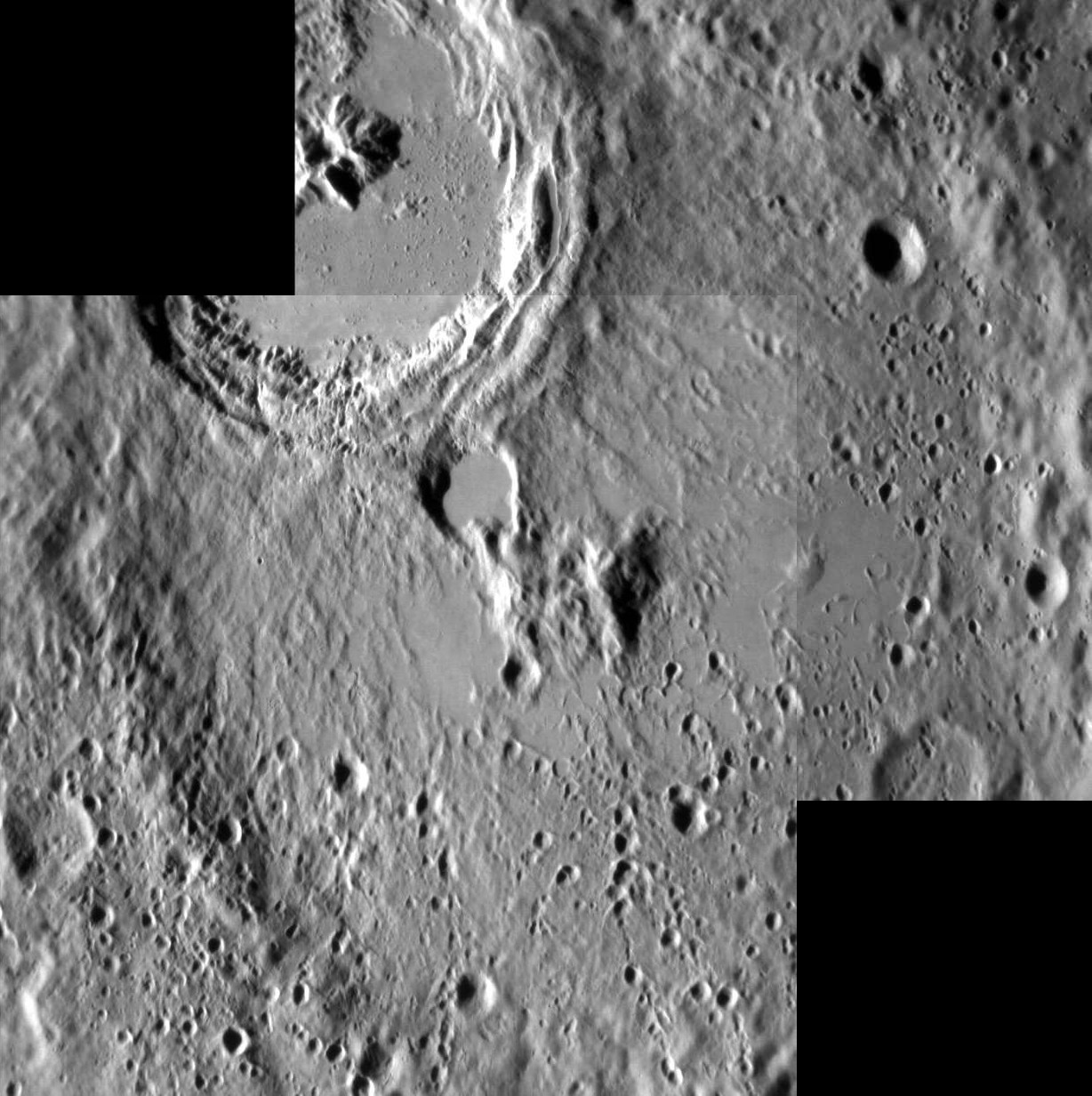
MESSENGER NAC mosaic of Murasaki crater. Much of Murasaki is overlain by ejecta, impact melt, and secondary craters from the Kuiper impact.

Murasaki is a crater on Mercury located at 12 S, 31 W. It is 132 km in diameter. It was named after 10th-11th century Japanese writer Murasaki Shikibu. The name was approved by IAU's Working Group for Planetary System Nomenclature in 1976. To its east lies the slightly larger Hiroshige. The bright crater Kuiper overlays the rim of Murasaki.
