= Ranger 7 =

NASA lunar impactor (1964)

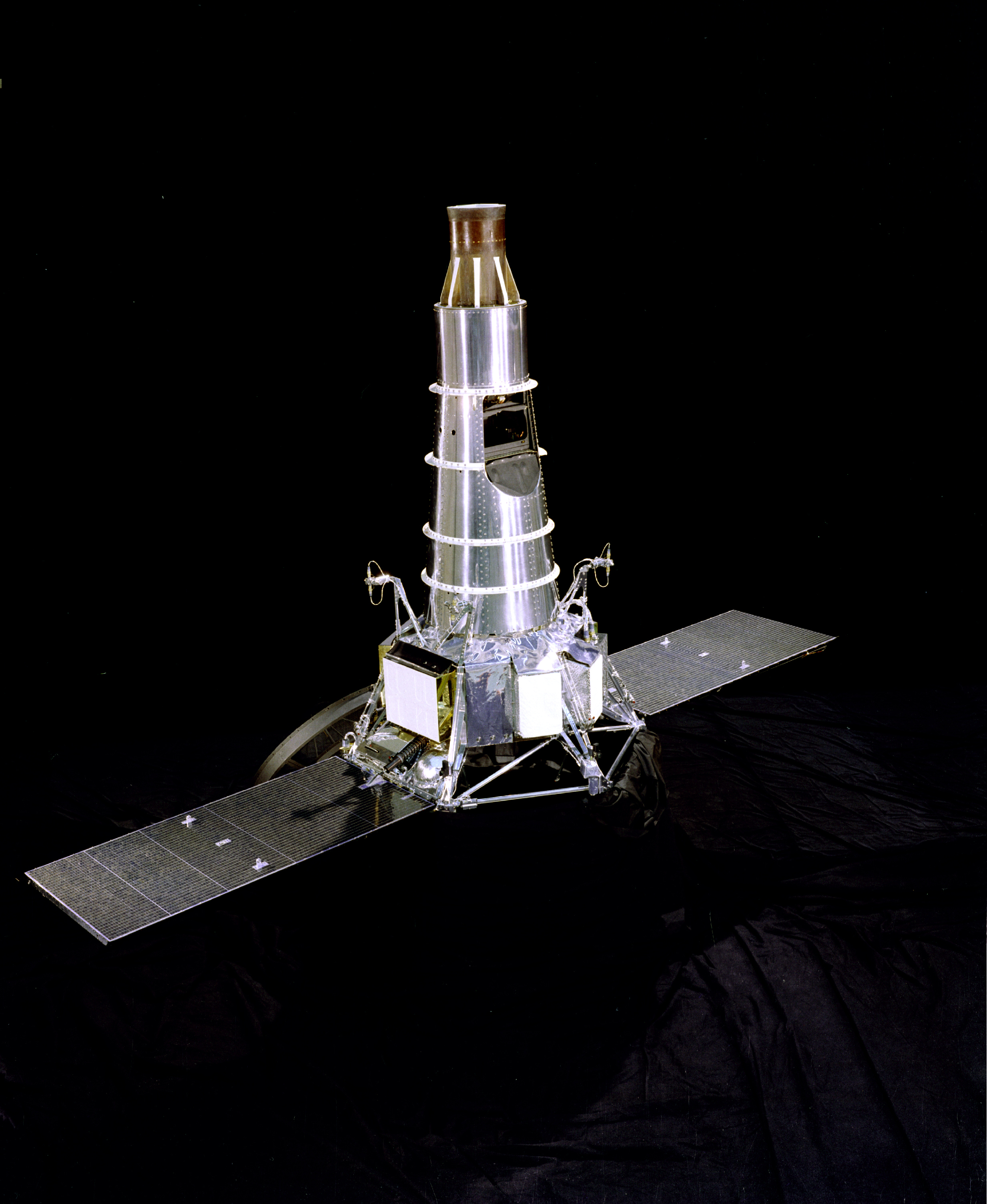
- Mission type: Lunar impactor
- Operator: NASA / JPL
- COSPAR ID: 1964-041A
- SATCAT no.: 00842
- Mission duration: 2 days, 20 hours and 35 minutes

Spacecraft properties
- Manufacturer: Jet Propulsion Laboratory
- Launch mass: 365.6 kg (806 lb)
- Dimensions: 1.52 m × 2.51 m (5.0 ft × 8.2 ft)
- Power: 200 W

Start of mission
- Launch date: July 28, 1964, 16:50:07 UTC
- Rocket: Atlas LV-3 Agena-B (250D / AA9)
- Launch site: Cape Canaveral, LC-12

Lunar impactor
- Impact date: July 31, 1964, 13:25:48.82 UTC
- Impact site: 10.6340°S 20.6771°W (Between Mare Nubium and Oceanus Procellarum)
Instruments
- Vidicon Television Cameras

Ranger 7 was the first NASA space probe to successfully transmit close-up images of the lunar surface back to Earth. It was also the first completely successful flight of the Ranger program. Launched on July 28, 1964, Ranger 7 was designed to achieve a lunar-impact trajectory and to transmit high-resolution photographs of the lunar surface during the final minutes of flight up to impact.

The spacecraft carried six television vidicon cameras—two wide-angle (channel F, cameras A and B) and four narrow-angle (channel P)—to accomplish these objectives. The cameras were arranged in two separate chains, or channels, each self-contained with separate power supplies, timers, and transmitters so as to afford the greatest reliability and probability of obtaining high-quality video pictures. Ranger 7 transmitted over 4,300 photographs during the final 17 minutes of its flight. After 68.6 hours of flight, the spacecraft impacted between Mare Nubium and Oceanus Procellarum. This landing site was later named Mare Cognitum. The velocity at impact was 2.61 kilometers per second (1.62 mi/s), and the performance of the spacecraft exceeded hopes. No other experiments were carried on the spacecraft.

== Aftermath of Ranger 6 and preparation for Ranger 7 ==
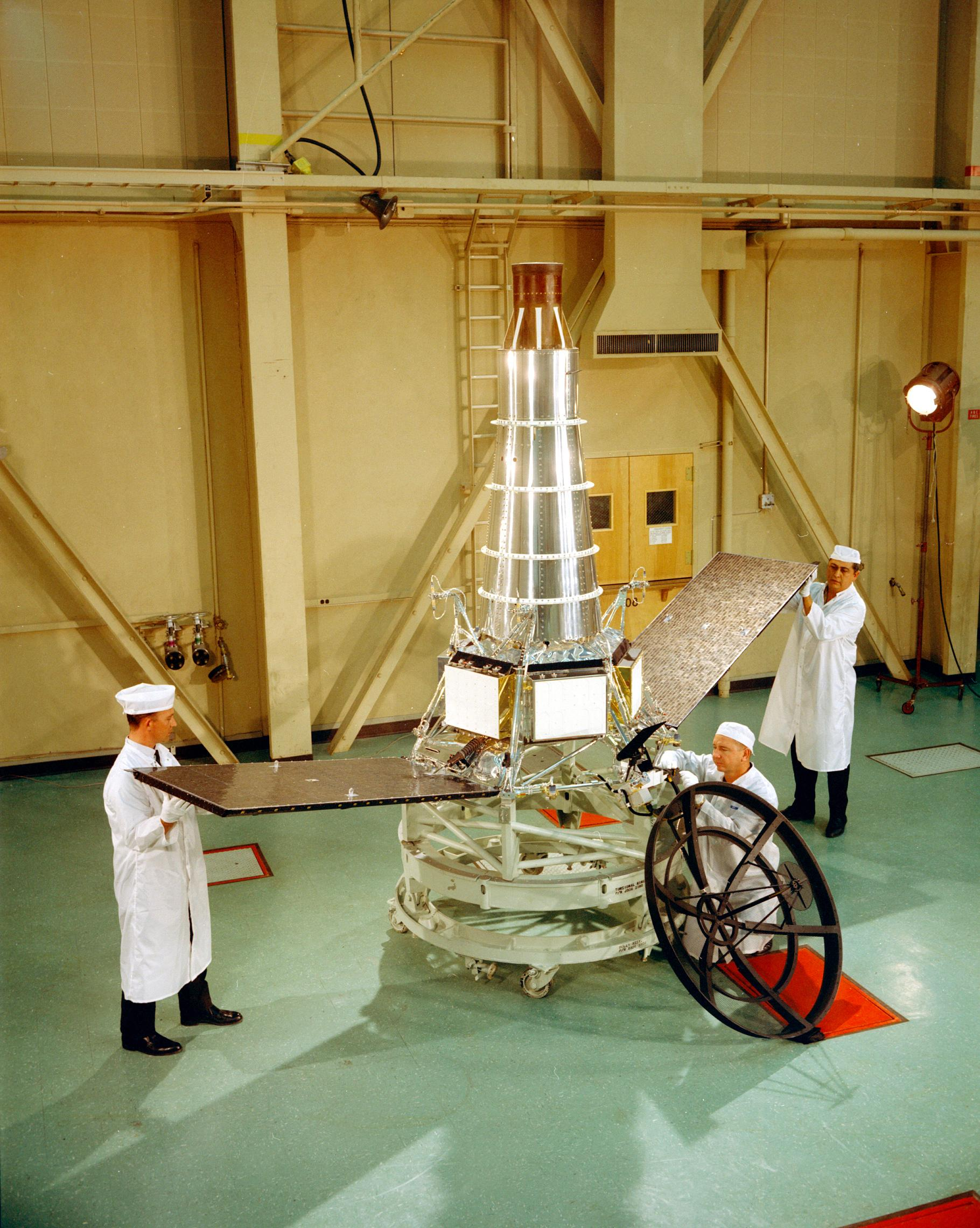
Ranger 7

Although NASA had attempted to put a positive spin on Ranger 6 on the grounds that everything except the camera system had worked well, William J. Coughlin, editor of the publication Missiles and Rockets, called it a "one hundred percent failure" and JPL's record thus far was "a disgrace". The mission had not been a complete failure, but Coughlin was not alone in his opinion that Jet Propulsion Laboratory in Pasadena, California, a nonprofit laboratory and extension of the California Institute of Technology (Caltech), was a "soft" academic environment without the drive or ambition needed to make the missions succeed. He considered Ranger a "loser" and, for a while, anyone at NASA involved in the Ranger program tried to conceal it. It was also being said that sending probes up for the sole purpose of returning images was pointless and accomplished nothing that Apollo could not also achieve.

Shortly after Ranger 6's mission concluded a review board was convened to resolve the cause of the TV camera failure. This was determined quickly; the inadvertent activation of the camera telemetry system during ascent had been caused by an electrical short that crippled the power supply for the cameras. But why it had happened was as yet a mystery, especially as telemetry data sent back from the probe could only provide a limited amount of information. On February 14, 1964, JPL released a report noting that an internal command switch could have activated prematurely or that arcing had occurred in the umbilical connector on the payload fairing. However, there was no evidence of the latter happening or any obvious way that it could occur and several modifications were proposed to the camera system and/or the payload fairing.

The NASA review board found that Ranger 6's systems were not as redundant as Jet Propulsion Laboratory had claimed, that prelaunch testing was inadequate, and there had been instances of the cameras turning themselves on at the RCA plant in New Jersey. If the cameras had to be completely redesigned from scratch, the next Ranger mission could be delayed almost a full year.

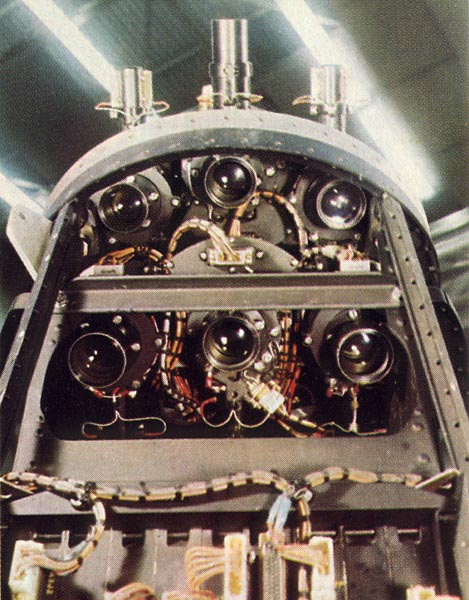
Ranger 7 cameras system

The full report as submitted to Congress came under criticism from several people at NASA, noting that, although the cameras lacked redundancy, any one of dozens of failure modes in the booster or spacecraft could also result in failure to return any TV images. In regards to the lack of adequate prelaunch testing, they brought up the incident in 1961 with Ranger 1 deploying its solar panels during a ground test and that ground tests with full 60 Watt power had been discontinued on the Block II probes for fear of accidentally igniting the midcourse correction engine on the pad and destroying the entire launch vehicle in the process.

RCA also promised to look into workmanship standards at their main plant in Hightstown, New Jersey, when examination of a sealed Ranger module discovered a plastic bag with screws and washers inside. Although there was suspicion that this had been done by a disgruntled employee, it was far more probable that someone had done it by accident.

Since no obvious reason for the malfunction could be found in the cameras themselves, investigation next shifted to the electrical umbilical on the payload fairing. This umbilical connector would normally be attached on the ground to permit testing of the Ranger's subsystems and only a thin hinged door covered it during launch. One of the pins on the connector was "hot" and could easily be bridged, transferring a voltage to the adjacent pins and activating the TV camera system during launch. As for the cause of it, one possibility was electrostatic discharge, the other was a shock wave of some sort.

Alexander Bratenahl, a physicist at JPL's Space Sciences Division, suggested that the electrical short was caused by venting propellant during Atlas booster section jettison. There was no tracking camera footage of this event on Ranger 6's launch, which had occurred on an overcast day, but film of other Atlas launches showed that a large white plume enveloped the launch vehicle after staging. Convair technicians confirmed that 51 kilograms (112 lb) of LOX was vented from the Atlas after staging, but although the shock wave theory seemed tempting, James Kendall, another Jet Propulsion Laboratory physicist, dismissed it out of hand. The idea of an electrostatic discharge was also unlikely given the thinning air and high altitude of the Atlas when staging occurred.

Bratenahl persisted and studied more film of Atlas launches with the frames enlarged, which revealed light flashes in the post-staging plume. Another phone call to Convair revealed that 30 kilograms (67 lb) of RP-1 were also dumped during staging and that the Atlas's sustainer engine exhaust ignited the propellant cloud, producing these flashes. Since the umbilical door on the payload shroud was only held in place with a thin latching mechanism, hot gases from igniting propellant could have contacted the electrical connector and caused a short. The inadvertent activation of the telemetry system during launch had occurred almost simultaneously with booster jettison at T+140 seconds. With that, the book could be closed on the cause of Ranger 6's failure.

Among the changes made for Ranger 7 included new procedures to apply full power testing to the spacecraft off of the launch pad, where there was no risk of the midcourse correction engine activating on top of a fully fueled Atlas-Agena.

Jet Propulsion Laboratory had originally wanted to have Ranger 7 impact in the same general area as Ranger 6 so the impact crater could be imaged, but lighting conditions during July would not be favorable so they instead decided to go for a little-known area 11° south of the Moon's equator near the Sea of Storms. The probe was shipped to Cape Canaveral in mid-June along with Atlas 250D and Agena 6009.

== Spacecraft design ==
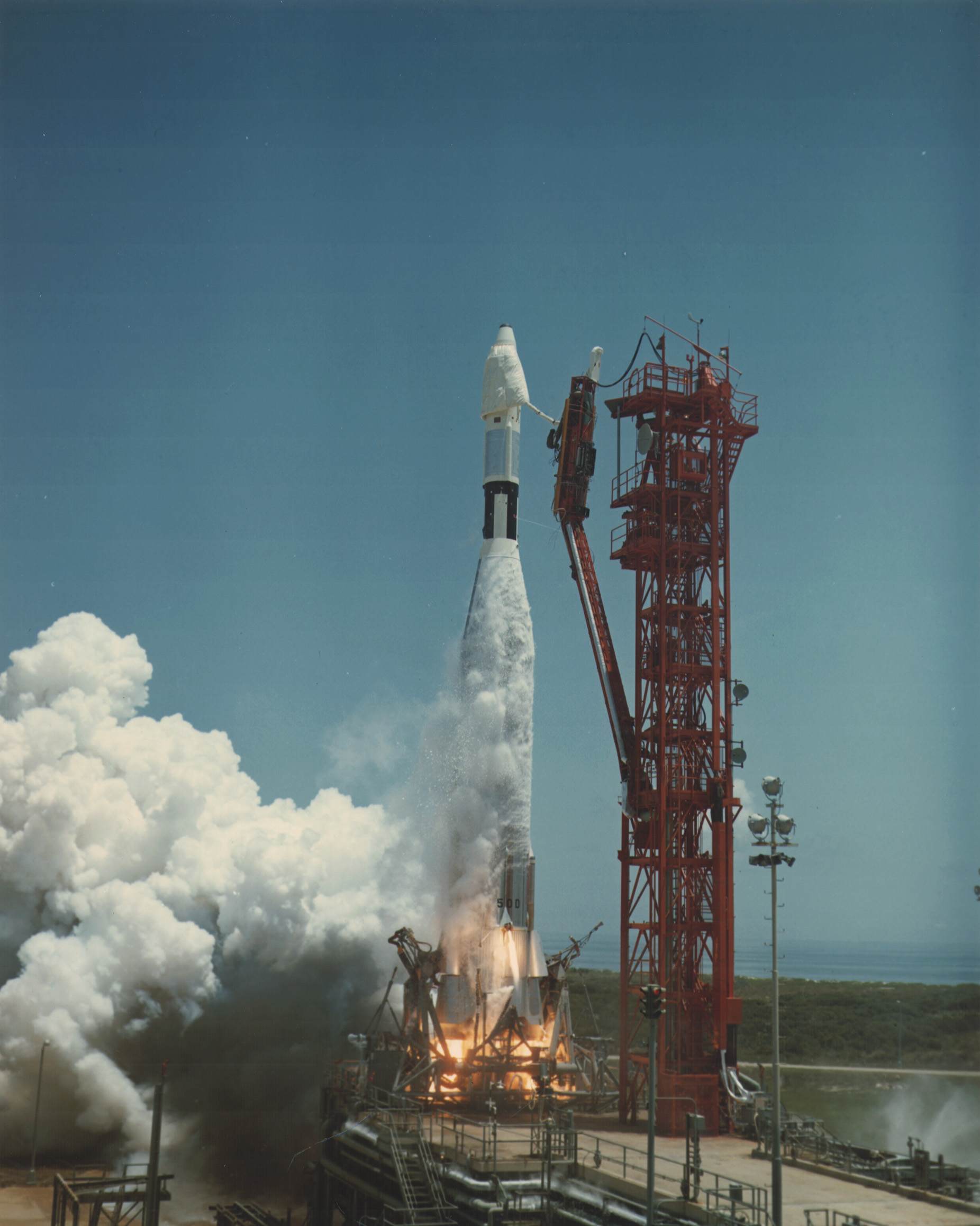
Launch of Atlas Agena B with Ranger 7

Rangers 6, 7, 8 and 9 were called Block 3 versions of the Ranger spacecraft. The spacecraft consisted of a hexagonal aluminum frame base 1.5 meters (4 ft 11 in) across on which was mounted the propulsion and power units, topped by a truncated conical tower which held the TV cameras. Two solar panel wings, each 739 millimeters (29.1 in) wide by 1,537 millimeters (60.5 in) long, extended from opposite edges of the base with a full span of 4.6 meters (15 ft), and a pointable high-gain dish antenna was hinge mounted at one of the corners of the base away from the solar panels. A cylindrical quasi-omnidirectional antenna was seated on top of the conical tower. The overall height of the spacecraft was 3.6 meters (12 ft).

Propulsion for the mid-course trajectory correction was provided by a 224-newton (50 lb_{f}) thrust monopropellant hydrazine engine with four jet-vane vector control. Orientation and attitude control about three axes was enabled by twelve nitrogen gas jets coupled to a system of three gyros, four primary Sun sensors, two secondary Sun sensors, and an Earth sensor. Power was supplied by 9,792 silicon solar cells contained in the two solar panels, giving a total array area of 2.3 square meters (25 sq ft) and producing 200 W. Two 1200 watt-hour AgZnO batteries rated at 26.5 V with a capacity for 9 hours of operation provided power to each of the separate communication/TV camera chains. Two 1000 watt-hour AgZnO batteries stored power for spacecraft operations.

Communications were through the quasi-omnidirectional low-gain antenna and the parabolic high-gain antenna. Transmitters aboard the spacecraft included a 60 W TV channel F at 959.52 MHz, a 60 W TV channel P at 960.05 MHz, and a 3 W transponder channel 8 at 960.58 MHz. The telecommunications equipment converted the composite video signal from the camera transmitters into an RF signal for subsequent transmission through the spacecraft high-gain antenna. Sufficient video bandwidth was provided to allow for rapid framing sequences of both narrow- and wide-angle television pictures.

== Mission profile ==
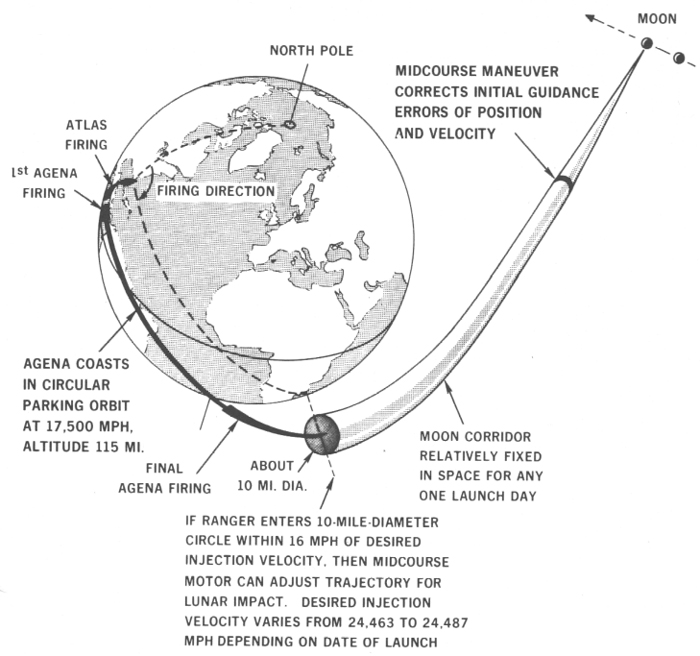
Typical Ranger flight trajectory to the Moon

On July 6, Ranger 7 completed its ground testing and was stacked atop the booster. On July 9, a NASA committee met and deemed the booster and spacecraft fully ready for launch, which was targeted for the 27th.

The first countdown on July 27 failed due to a defective battery in the Atlas and a problem with the ground guidance equipment. The next day, all went smoothly and Ranger 7 lifted off from LC-12 at 12:50 PM EST. The weather was clear and cloudless on this launch and Atlas staging was observed by tracking cameras. The expected propellant cloud enveloped the booster, but no anomalous events occurred this time. Thirty minutes after liftoff, the Agena restarted to boost Ranger 7 on a trajectory towards the Moon.

The flight trajectory for Ranger 7 was quite accurate, but a short midcourse correction was carried out early on the morning of July 29 to ensure impact in the Sea of Storms instead of the far side of the Moon. The warmup period for the TV cameras would be performed earlier and made shorter than on Ranger 6. Out of fear of jeopardizing the mission, ground controllers decided that the probe's orientation was acceptable enough and they would not risk maneuvering with the attitude control thrusters to get into a better angle. At 6:09 AM PDT, the first video imagery reached Earth.

As Ranger 7 sped towards the surface of the Moon, TV camera performance remained normal. Images of the cratered lunar surface continued to filter back to JPL headquarters in Pasadena, California, and finally, at 6:25, impact occurred and all signals from the probe ceased. In the JPL control room, there was "rapturous celebration". Ranger 7 had delivered the first close-distance imagery of the lunar surface and "more than anything, even the manned Mercury missions, had at last undone the sting Americans felt at Sputnik 1's launch".

The photographs returned from the probe found that the Moon was most likely "very craggy and rocky with debris everywhere". After speaking to the media, NASA officials were peppered with the obvious question – did the Moon have a surface solid enough that humans could safely land on it? Geologist Gerard Kuiper replied that judging by the images, it seemed likely that at least some of the Moon was smooth enough to land a spacecraft on. However, the actual hardness of the surface couldn't be determined with certainty until a soft landing was made. Nonetheless, Ranger 7's images did seem to suggest that it was solid enough.

Ranger 7 reached the Moon on July 31. The F-channel began its one-minute warm-up 18 minutes before impact. The first image was taken at 13:08:45 UT at an altitude of 2,110 kilometers (1,310 mi). Transmission of 4,308 photographs of excellent quality occurred over the final 17 minutes of flight. The final image taken before impact has a resolution of 0.5 meters (1.6 ft). The spacecraft encountered the lunar surface in direct motion along a hyperbolic trajectory, with an incoming asymptotic direction at an angle of -5.57° from the lunar equator. The orbit plane was inclined 26.84° to the lunar equator. After 68.6 hours of flight, Ranger 7 impacted in an area between Mare Nubium and Oceanus Procellarum (subsequently named Mare Cognitum) at 10.6340°S 20.6771°W. (The impact site is listed as 10.63 S, 20.66 W in the initial report "Ranger 7 Photographs of the Moon".) Impact occurred at 13:25:48.82 UT at a velocity of 2.62 km/s (1.63 mi/s). The spacecraft performance was excellent and the success of the mission finally brought a turnaround in NASA's fortunes after the endless string of lunar probe failures since 1958.

Ranger 7 is credited for beginning the "peanut" tradition at NASA command stations. On the success of Ranger 7, someone in the control room was noticed eating peanuts. Since 1964, control rooms ceremonially open a container of peanuts for luck and tradition.

Ranger 7 descent images

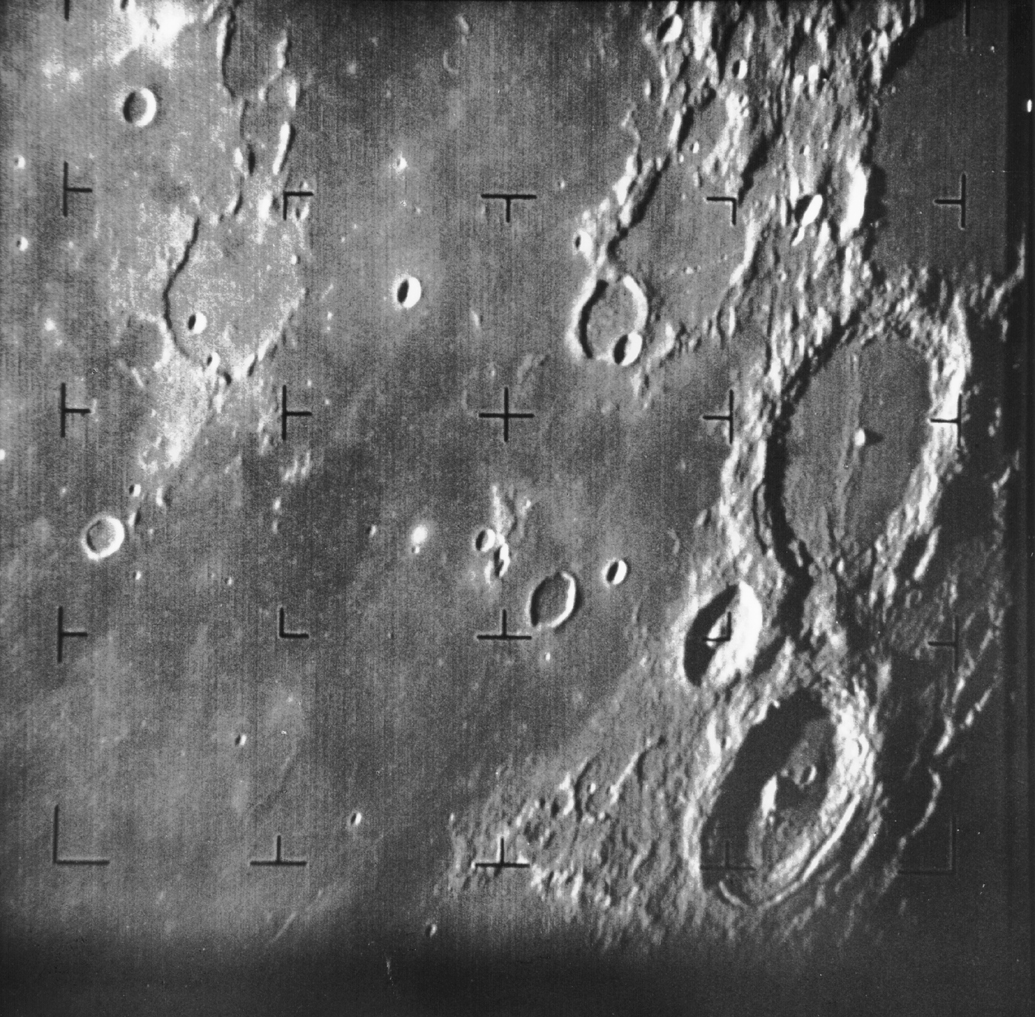
First image, about 17 minutes before impact. Features: The large crater at center right is Alphonsus.

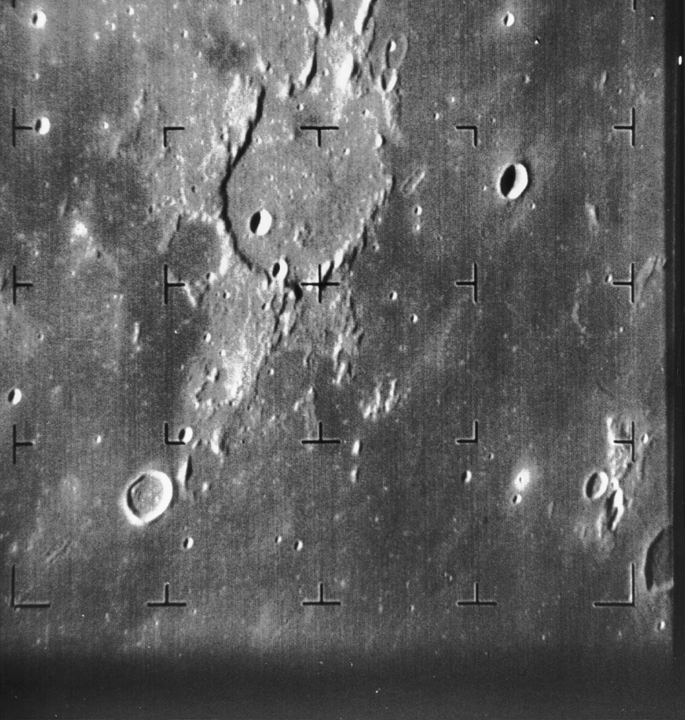
Altitude: 830 miles (1,340 km). Features: Image of Guericke crater, taken 8.5 minutes before impact.

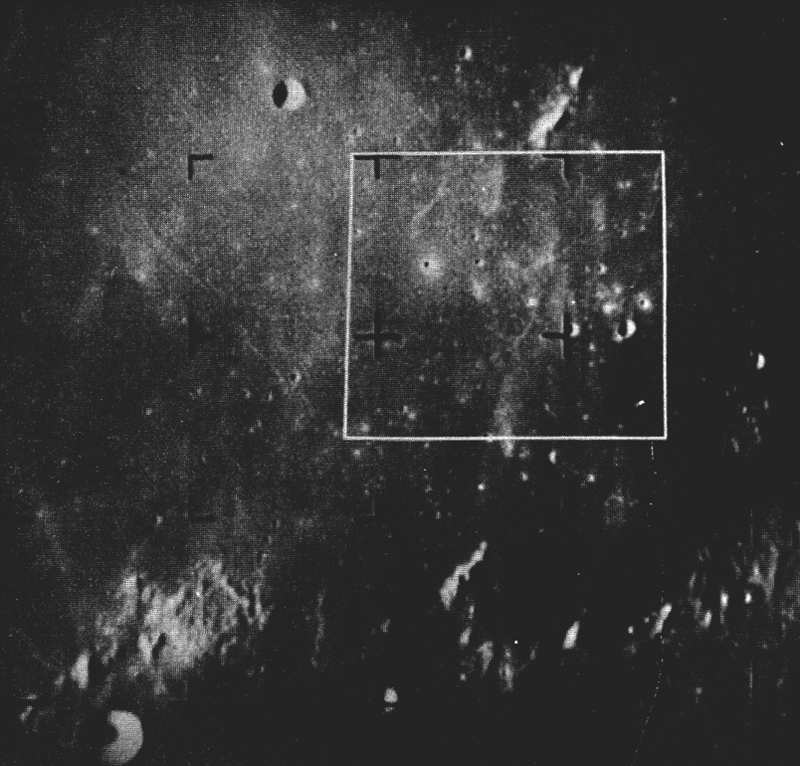
Altitude: 235 miles (378 km). Features: Note increase in detail of Bonpland H and its twin crater (to left of Bonpland H).

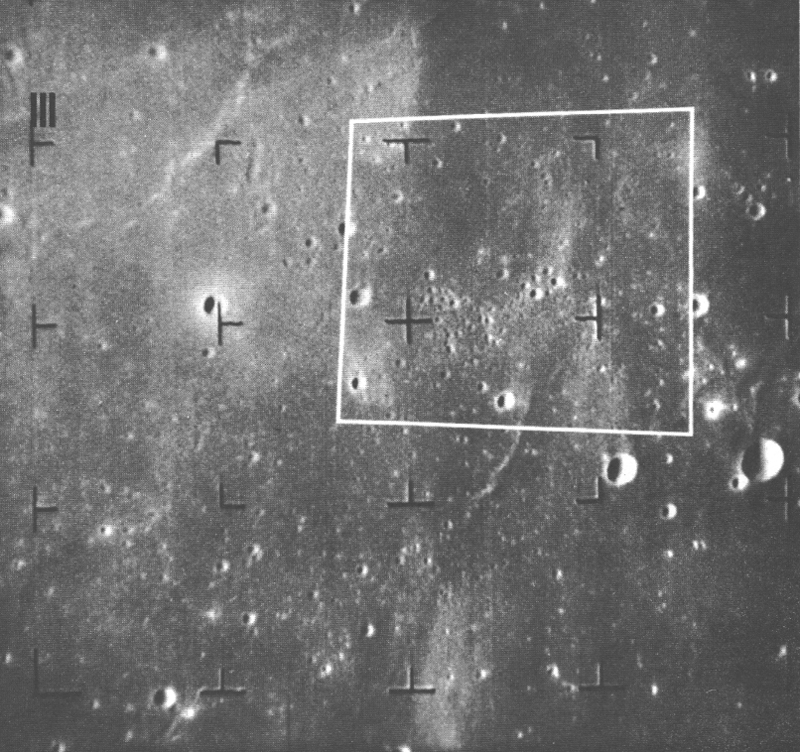
Altitude: 85 miles (137 km). Features: Cluster of secondary craters in part of a ray of the Crater Tycho becomes distinct.

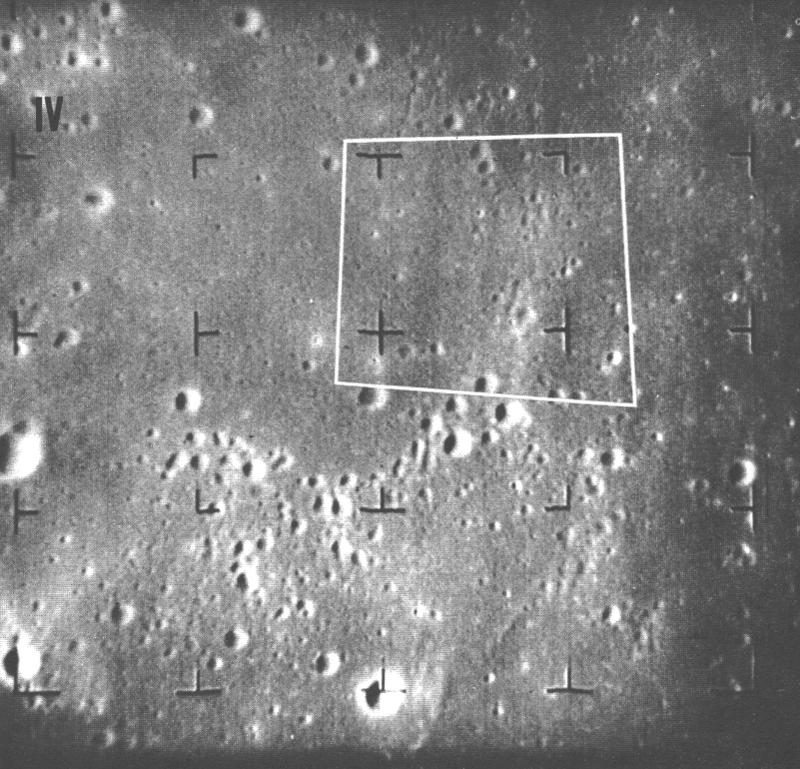
Altitude: 34 miles (55 km). Features: Greater resolution of craters in outlying ray of Tycho.

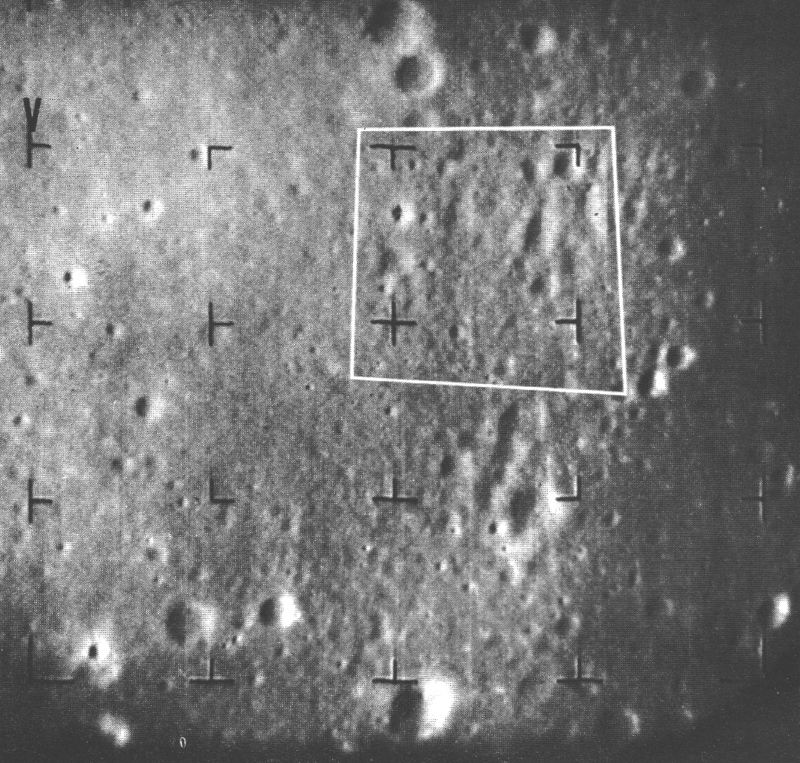
Altitude: 11 miles (18 km). Features: Crater near upper left of area outlined in white.

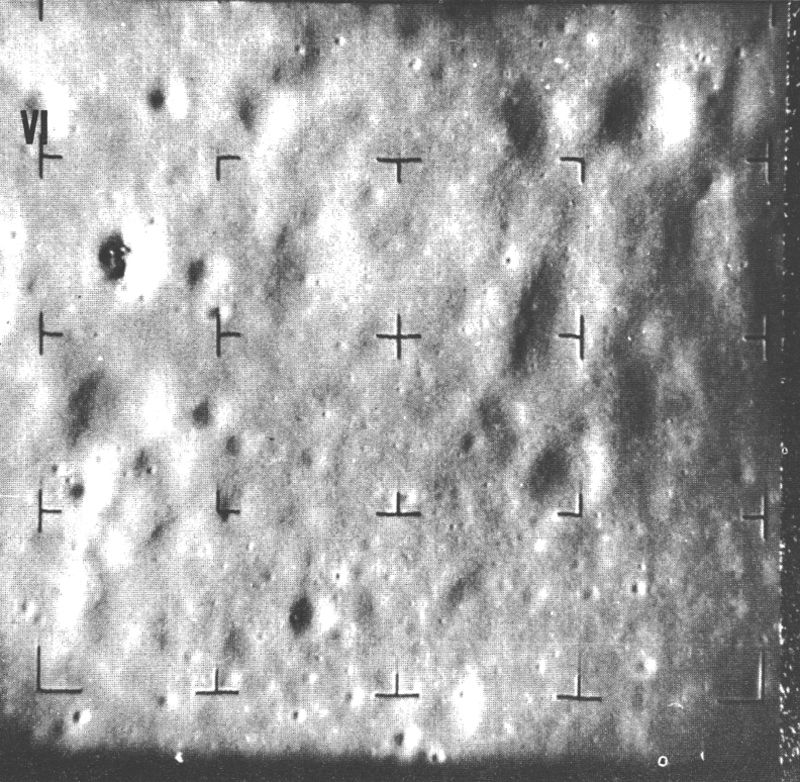
Altitude: 3.6 miles (5.8 km). Features: Angular rock mass in crater at upper left. Preliminary study indicates the mass to be several separate chunks.

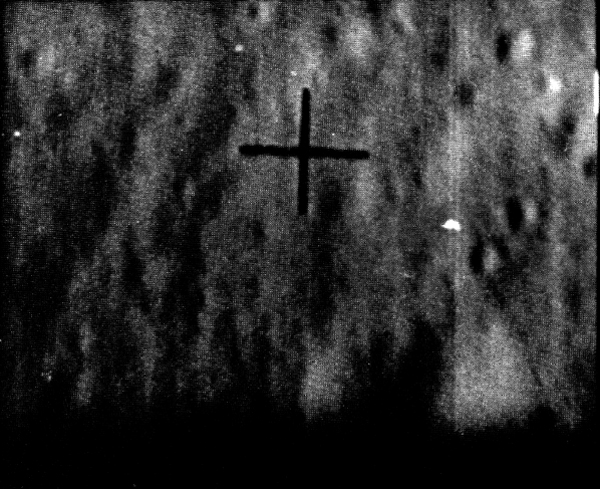
Photo taken by Ranger 7 at 3,000 foot (910 m) altitude shows area 100 feet (30 m) in each side.

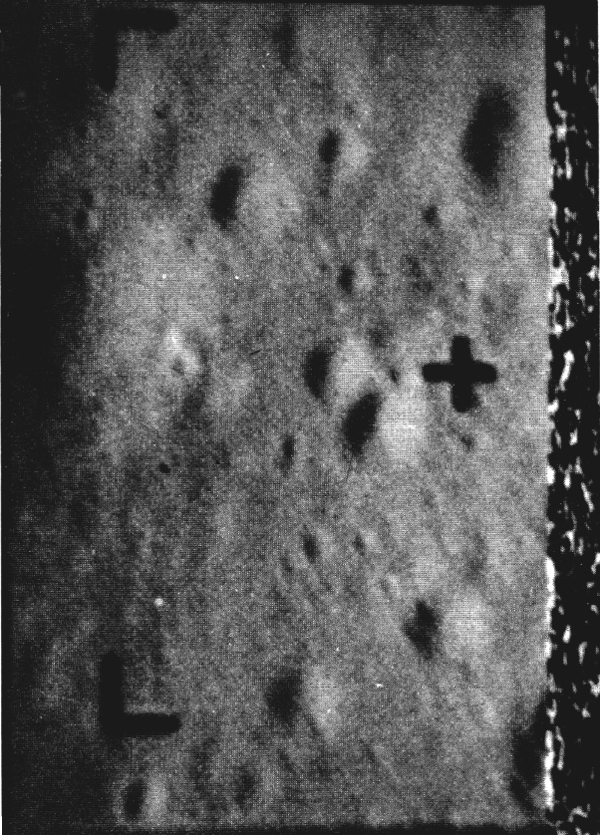
Last picture by Ranger 7, taken about 1,600 feet (490 m) above the moon, reveals features as small as 15 inches (0.38 m) across. Receiver noise pattern at right results from spacecraft crash on the moon while transmitting.

== See also ==
- Ranger program
- Timeline of Solar System exploration
- List of artificial objects on the Moon
- List of missions to the Moon
