= Namatjira (crater) =

Crater on Mercury

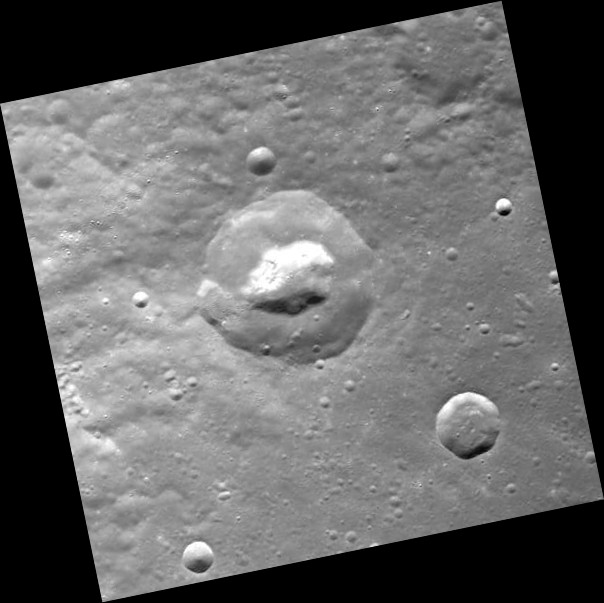
- MESSENGER WAC
- Planet: Mercury
- Coordinates: 58.82°N 33.04°W
- Quadrangle: Victoria
- Diameter: 34.0 km (21.1 mi)
- Eponym: Albert Namatjira

Namatjira is a crater on Mercury. It has a diameter of 34 kilometers. Its name was adopted by the International Astronomical Union (IAU) on September 25, 2015. Namatjira is named for the Australian aboriginal artist Albert Namatjira.

An irregular depression is present in the center of Namatjira, which is similar to those within Navoi, Lermontov, Scarlatti, and Praxiteles. The depressions resemble those associated with volcanic explosions. The depression contains hollows.

Namatjira lies on the western margin of a part of the Borealis Planitia. To the west of Namatjira is Boznańska crater, and to the south are the Victoria Rupes.

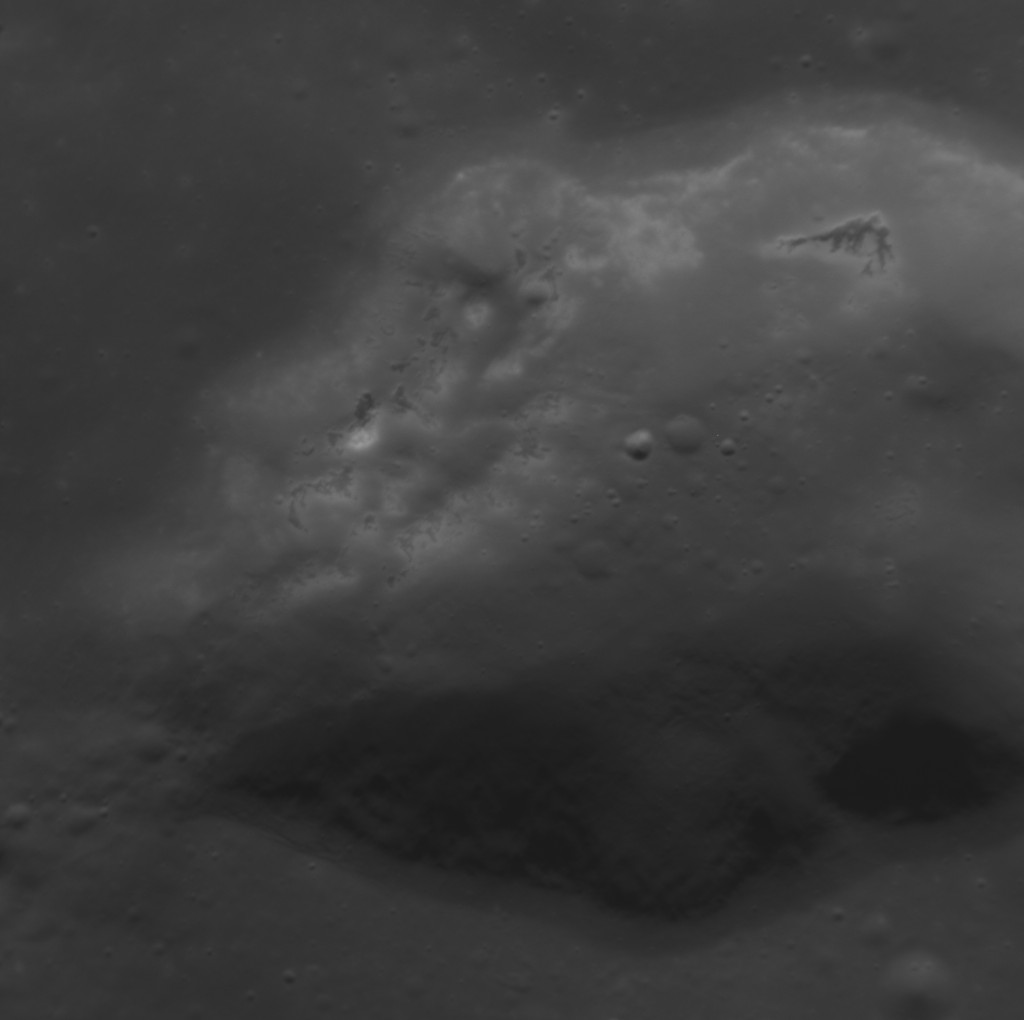
The irregular depression in Namatjira contains hollows
