= Duccio (crater) =

Crater on Mercury

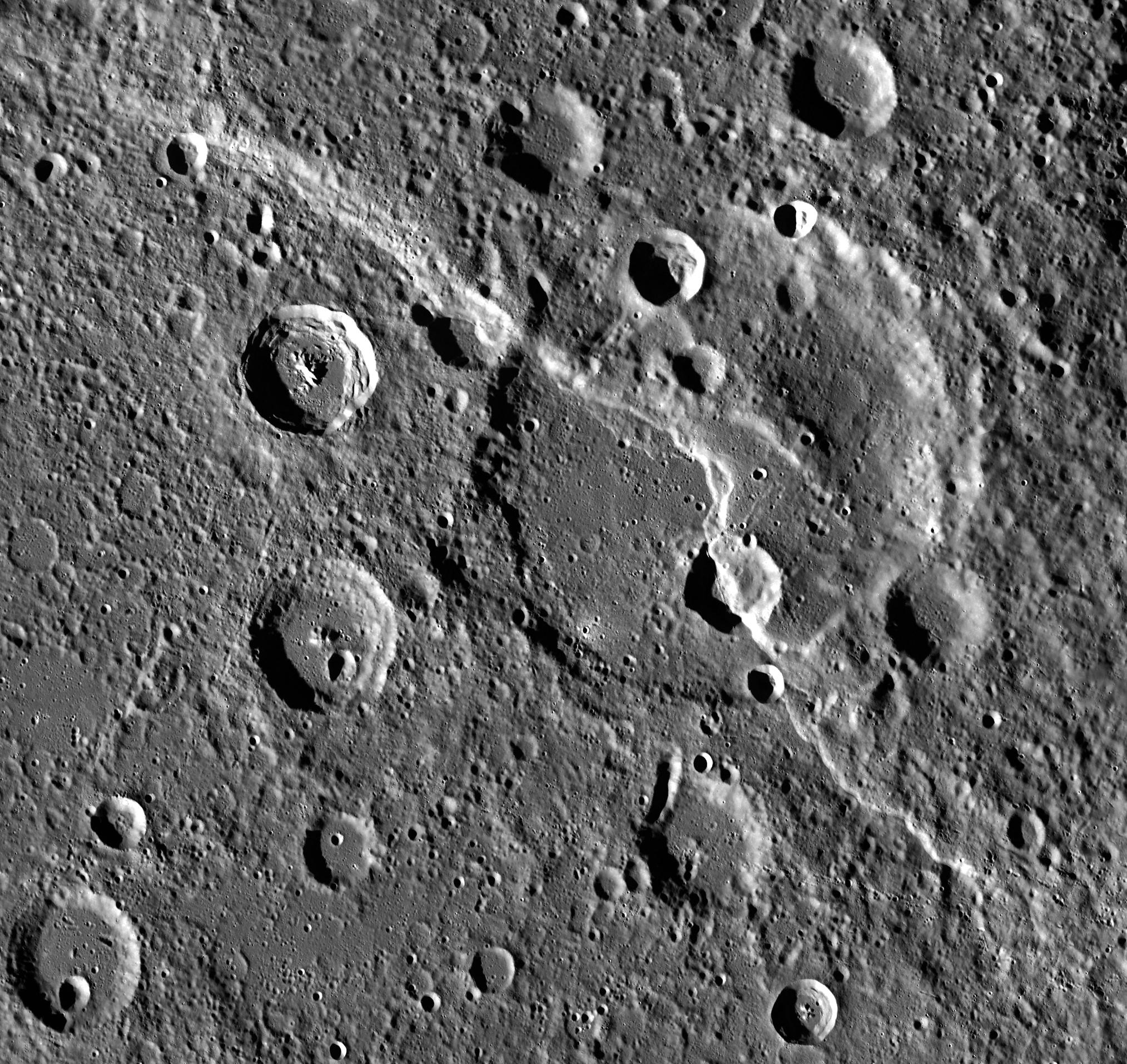
- Carnegie Rupes cuts across Duccio crater
- Feature type: Impact crater
- Location: Victoria quadrangle, Mercury
- Coordinates: 58.23°N 52.42°W
- Diameter: 132 km
- Eponym: Duccio di Buoninsegna

Duccio is a crater on Mercury. Its name was adopted by the International Astronomical Union (IAU) on June 14, 2013. Duccio is named for the Italian painter Duccio di Buoninsegna.

Carnegie Rupes cuts across Duccio crater. The crater Boznańska is to the east of Duccio, and Rubens is to the west.
