= Boznańska (crater) =

Crater on Mercury

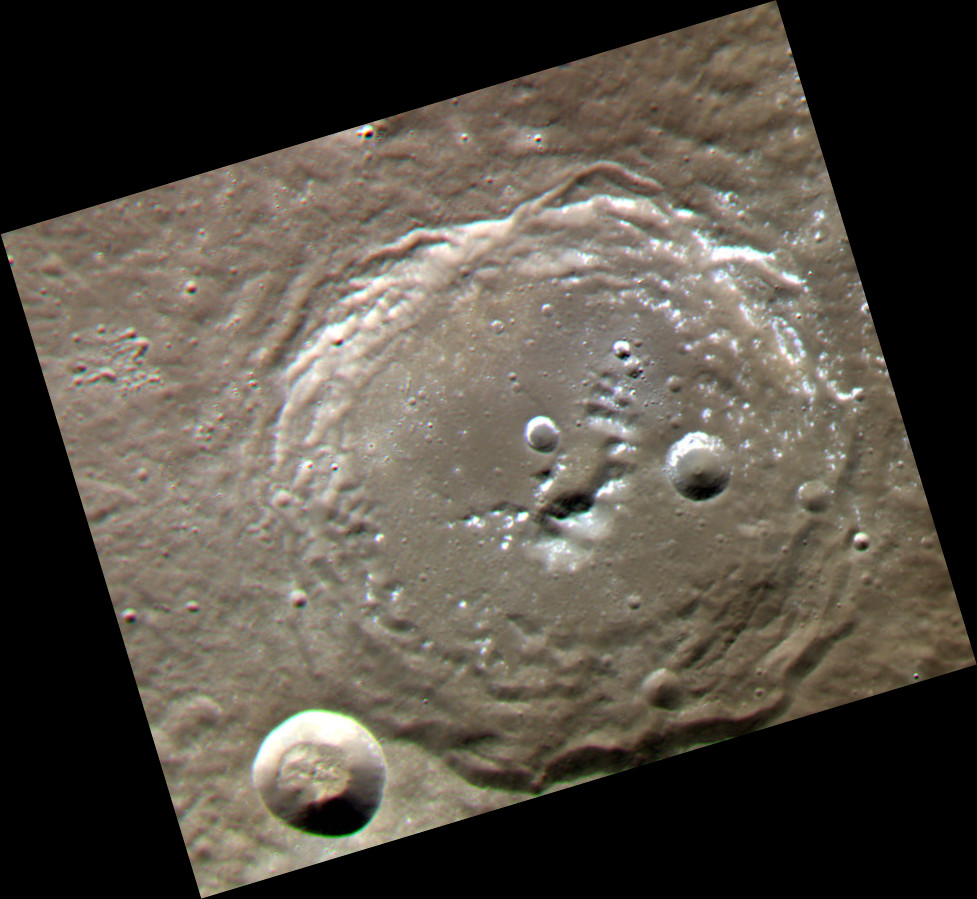
- Approximate color view of Boznańska by MESSENGER
- Feature type: Central-peak impact crater
- Location: Victoria quadrangle, Mercury
- Coordinates: 59.64°N 40.75°W
- Diameter: 72 km
- Eponym: Olga Boznańska

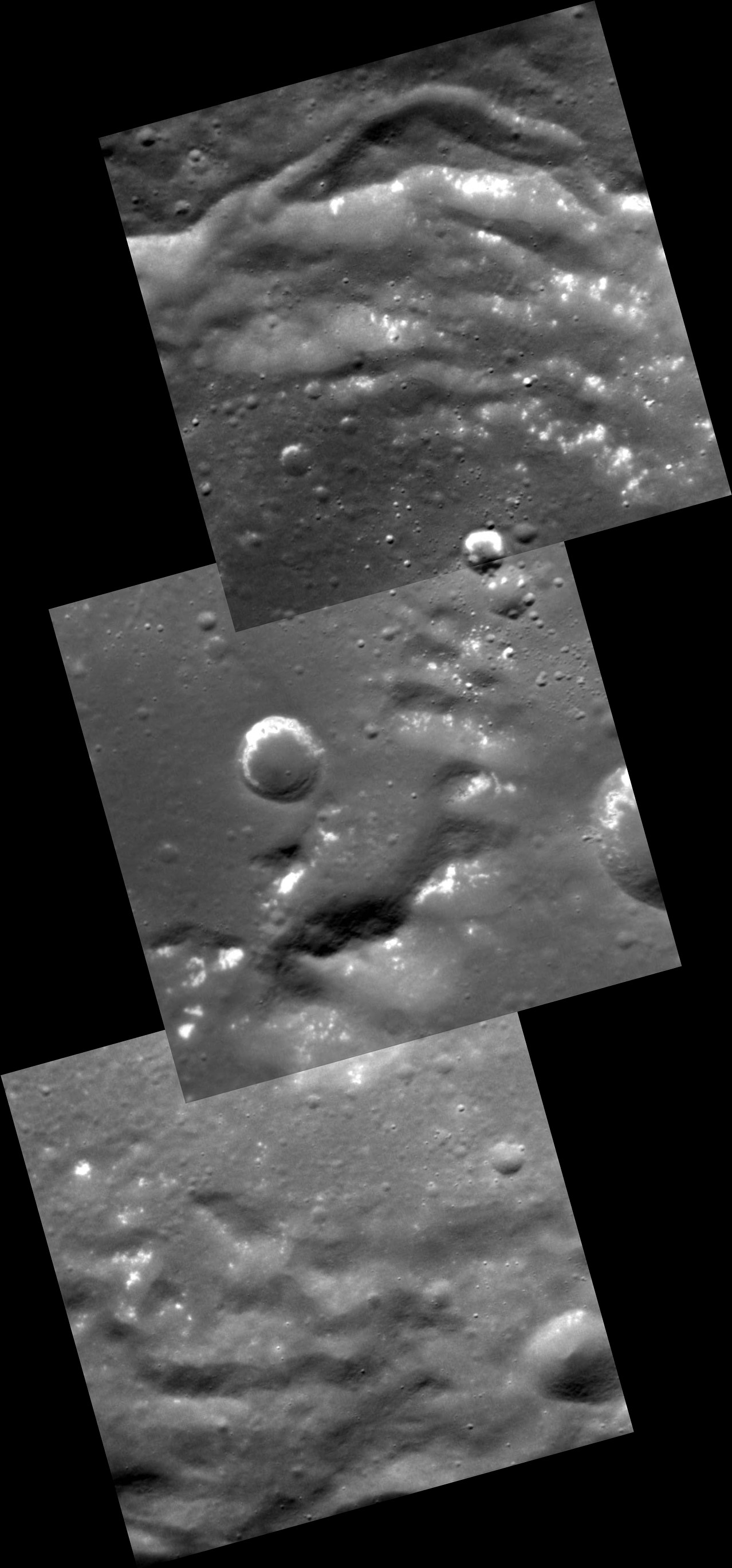
Interior, showing hollows

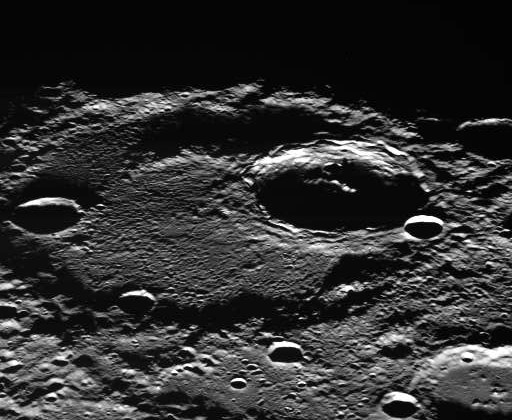
Boznańska crater (right of center) lies within a larger, older, unnamed crater

Boznańska is a crater on Mercury. Its name was adopted by the International Astronomical Union (IAU) on September 25, 2015. Boznańska is named for the Polish painter Olga Boznańska.

Boznańska contains hollows, located on or close to the central peak complex, as well as on the upper walls of small craters at the center and on the eastern floor.

To the west of Boznańska is Duccio crater, and to the east is Namatjira crater.
