= Carnegie Rupes =

Escarpment on Mercury

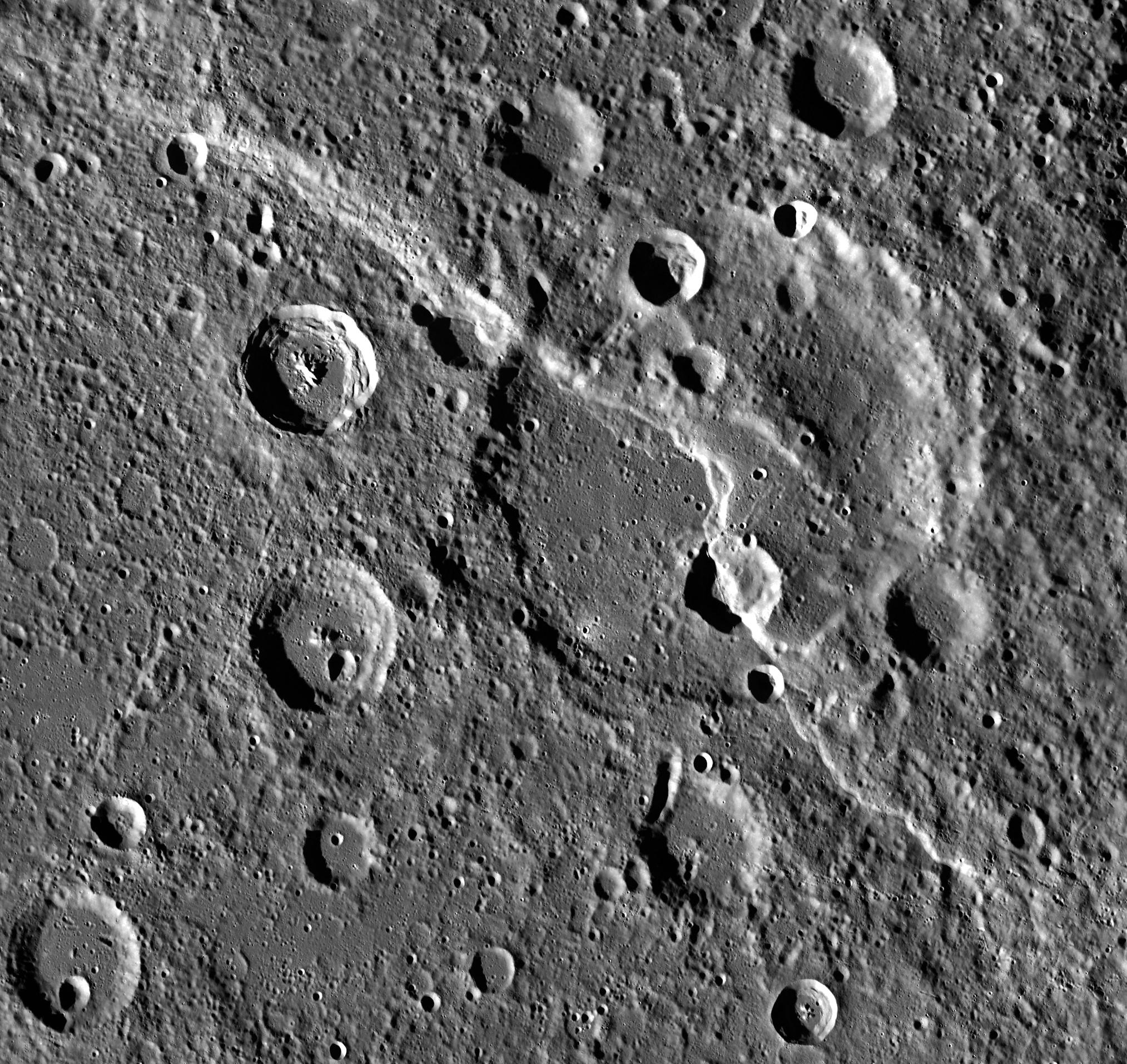
- MESSENGER mosaic showing Carnegie Rupes cutting across Duccio crater
- Feature type: Rupes
- Coordinates: 58.52°N 53.25°W
- Length: 267 km
- Eponym: Carnegie vessel

Carnegie Rupes is an escarpment on Mercury, approximately 267 kilometers (166 mi) long, located at latitude 58.52 N and longitude 53.25 W. It was formed by a thrust fault, thought to have occurred due to the shrinkage of the planet's core as it cooled over time. The scarp cuts through Duccio crater.

The rupes are named after the Carnegie, a wooden (non-magnetic) American ship used to carry out magnetic observations.

== See also ==
- List of escarpments
