= Outline of Mercury (planet) =

Closest planet to the Sun

The following outline is provided as an overview of and topical guide to Mercury:

Mercury – smallest and innermost planet in the Solar System. Its orbital period (about 88 Earth days) is less than any other planet in the Solar System. Seen from Earth, it appears to move around its orbit in about 116 days. It has no known natural satellites. It is named after the Roman deity Mercury, the messenger to the gods.

== Classification of Mercury ==
- Astronomical object
  - Gravitationally rounded object
    - Planet
      - Planet of the Solar System
        - Inferior planet
        - Inner planet
      - Terrestrial planet

== Location of Mercury ==
- Milky Way Galaxy – barred spiral galaxy
  - Orion Arm – a spiral arm of the Milky Way
    - Solar System – the Sun and the objects that orbit it, including 8 planets, the planet closest to the Sun being Mercury
      - Mercury's orbit

== Movement of Mercury ==
- Mercury's orbit and rotation
- Transit of Mercury

== Features of Mercury ==
- Mercury's magnetic field
- Atmosphere of Mercury
- Mercury's extraterrestrial sky
- Geology of Mercury
  - Geological features on Mercury
    - Craters on Mercury
      - Ghost craters on Mercury
    - Inter-crater plains on Mercury
- Albedo features on Mercury
- Quadrangles on Mercury

== Natural satellites of Mercury ==
- Hypothetical moon of Mercury

== History of Mercury ==
History of Mercury –

- Pre-Tolstojan –
- Tests of general relativity –
- Mercury-crossing minor planets –

=== Exploration of Mercury ===
Exploration of Mercury –

==== Flyby missions to explore Mercury ====
- Mariner 10 –

==== Direct missions to explore Mercury ====
- MESSENGER –

== Future of Mercury exploration ==
=== Proposed missions to explore Mercury ===
- BepiColombo
- Mercury-P
- Colonization of Mercury

== Mercury in popular culture ==
- Mercury in fiction

== See also ==
- Outline of astronomy
  - Outline of the Solar System
- Outline of space exploration
