= Baranauskas =

Baranauskas is a Lithuanian family name. Its feminine forms are: Baranauskienė (married woman or widow) and Baranauskaitė (unmarried woman).

Notable people with the surname include:

- Aivaras Baranauskas (born 1980), Lithuanian professional track cyclist
- Antanas Baranauskas (1835–1902), Lithuanian poet and bishop
- Boleslovas Baranauskas
- Juozas Baranauskas
- Tomas Baranauskas (born 1973), Lithuanian historian
- Stasys Baranauskas (1962–2026), Lithuanian football player

== See also ==
- Baranowski, Polish version
- Baranovsky, Russian version
- Baranauskas (crater)
