= Baranoski =

Baranoski is a surname. Notable people with the surname include:

- Edward Baranoski, American engineer
- Matthew Baranoski (born 1993), American professional racing cyclist

== See also ==
- Barański
- Baranowski
