= Baranovskyi =

Baranovskyi, feminine" Baranovska is a Ukrainian surname, phonetic transliteration of the Polish surname Baranowski, Russian variant Baranovsky. Notable people with the surname include:

- Artem Baranovskyi (born 1990), Ukrainian football midfielder
- Leonid Baranovskyi (1953−2013), Ukrainian football midfielder
