= Anna Barańska =

Anna Barańska may refer to:

- Anna Werblińska (born 1984), née Barańska, Polish volleyball player
- Anna Barańska (climber) (born 1976), Polish mountaineer
