= Barański =

Barański (feminine: Barańska; plural: Barańscy) is a Polish surname. It is related to the following surnames:

Language	Masculine	Feminine
Polish	Barański	Barańska
Lithuanian	Baranskas	
Hungarian	Baránszki	
Russian (Romanization)	Баранский (Baranskiy, Baransky)	Баранская (Baranskaya, Baranskaia)
Ukrainian (Romanization)	Баранський (Baranskyi, Baranskyy)	Баранська (Baranska)

== People ==
- Agata Barańska (born 1993), Polish tennis player
- Andrzej Barański (born 1941), Polish film director
- Anna Barańska (born 1984), Polish volleyball player
- Anna Barańska (born 1976), Polish mountaineer
- Celeste Baranski (born 1957), American electronic engineer, entrepreneur, and executive
- Christine Baranski (born 1952), American actress
- Feliks Barański (1915–2006), Polish mathematician
- Jadwiga Barańska (1935–2024), Polish actress
- Nikolay Baransky (1881–1963) Soviet economic geographer
- Renata Baranski (born 1965), Polish-American tennis player
- Tibor Baranski (1922–2019), Hungarian-American Righteous Among the Nations
