= Geology of Mercury =

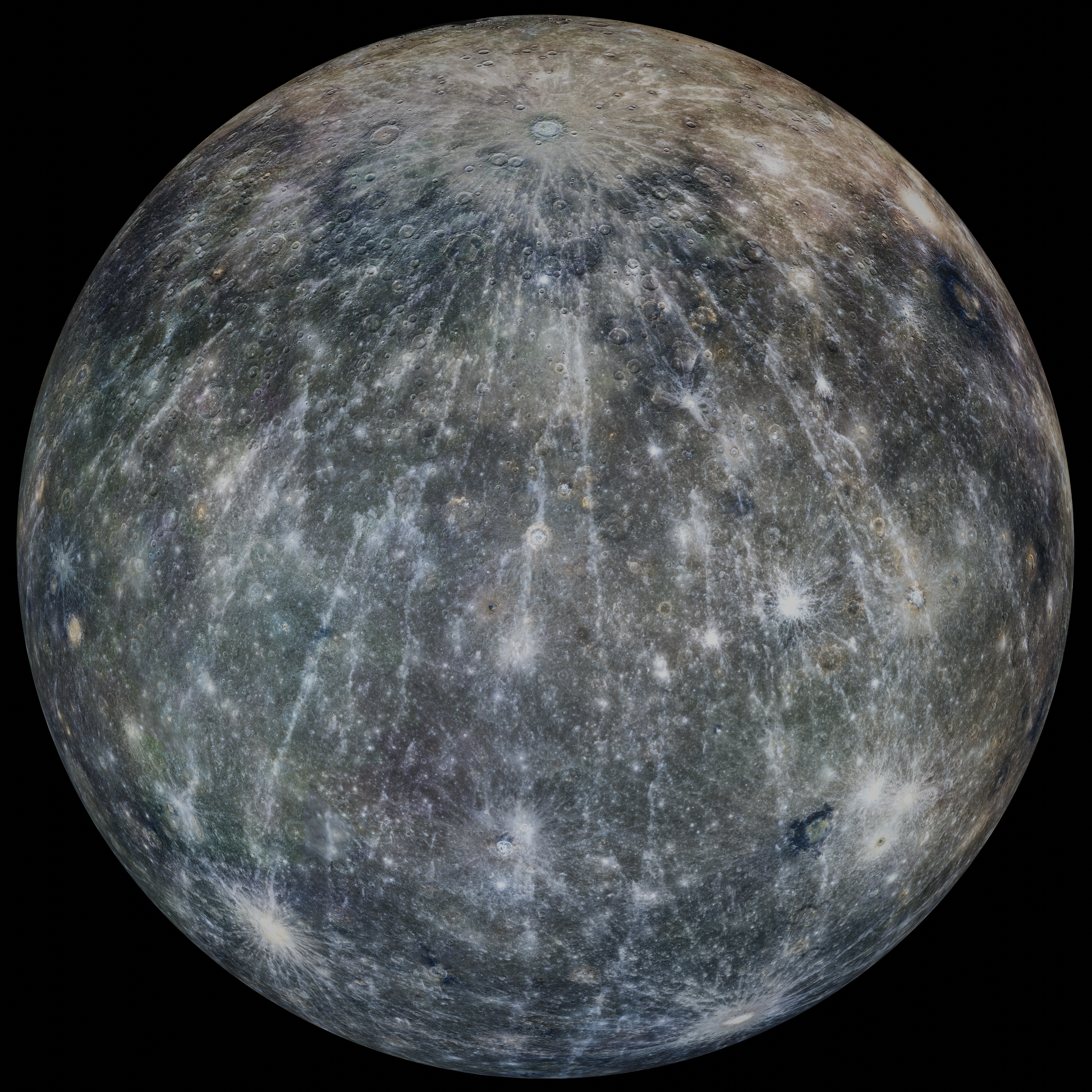
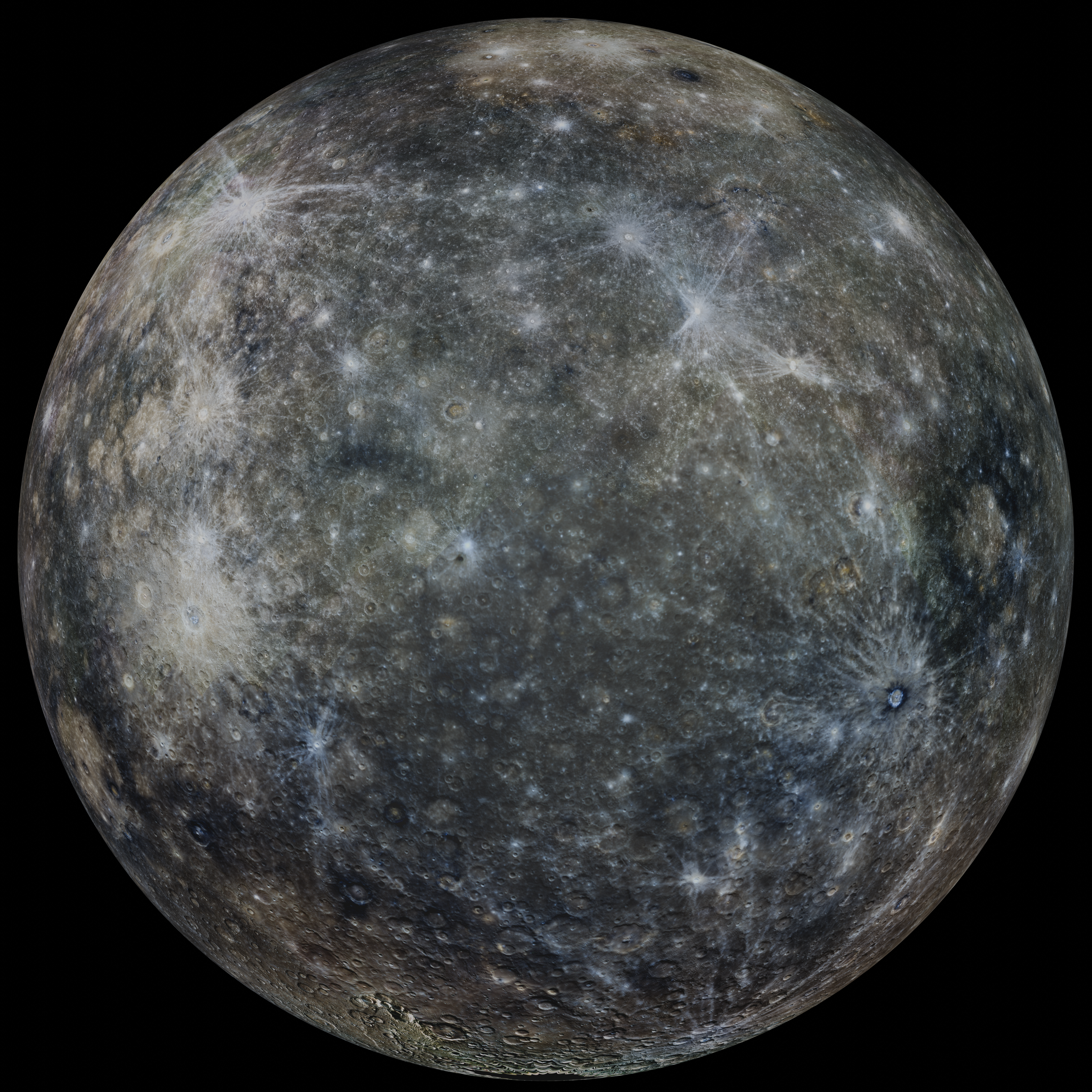
Mercury rendered with Blender with data from NASA and the USGS

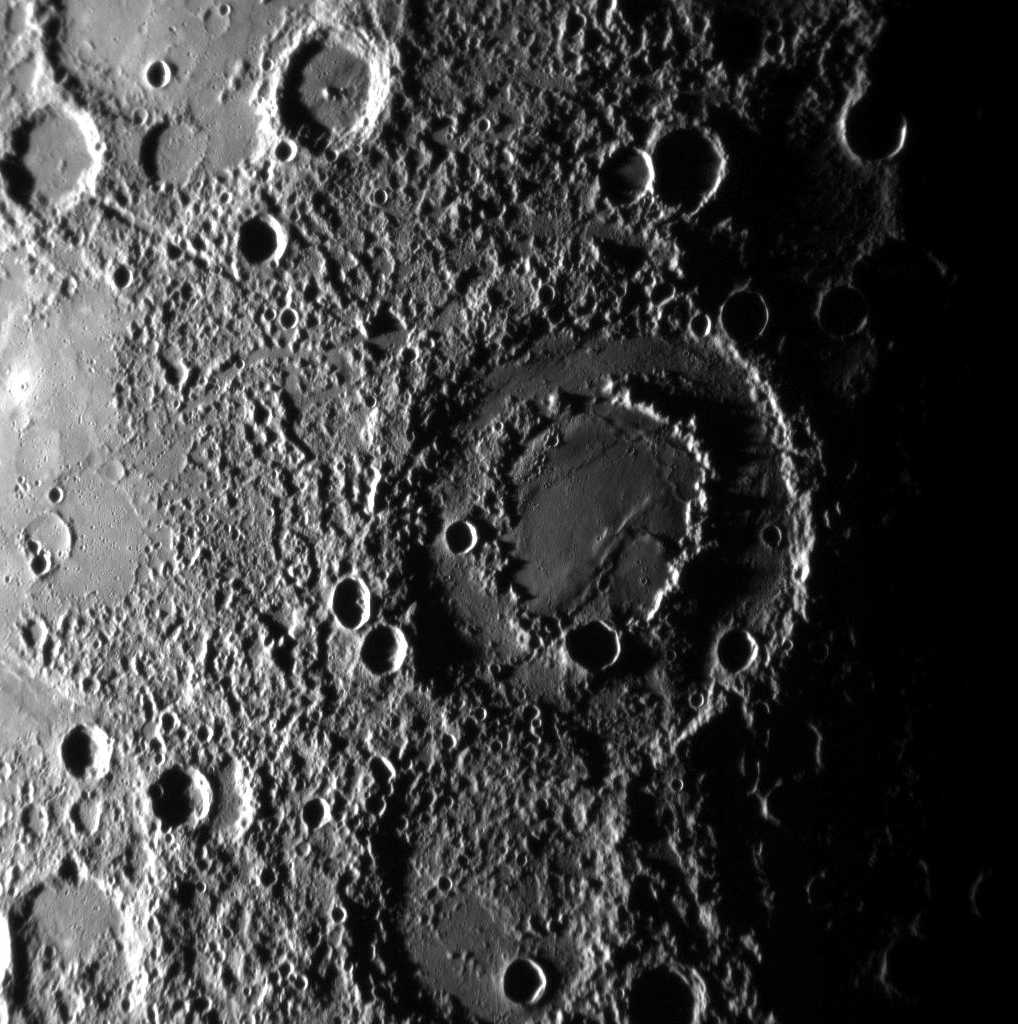
Caravaggio is an example of a peak ring impact basin on Mercury.

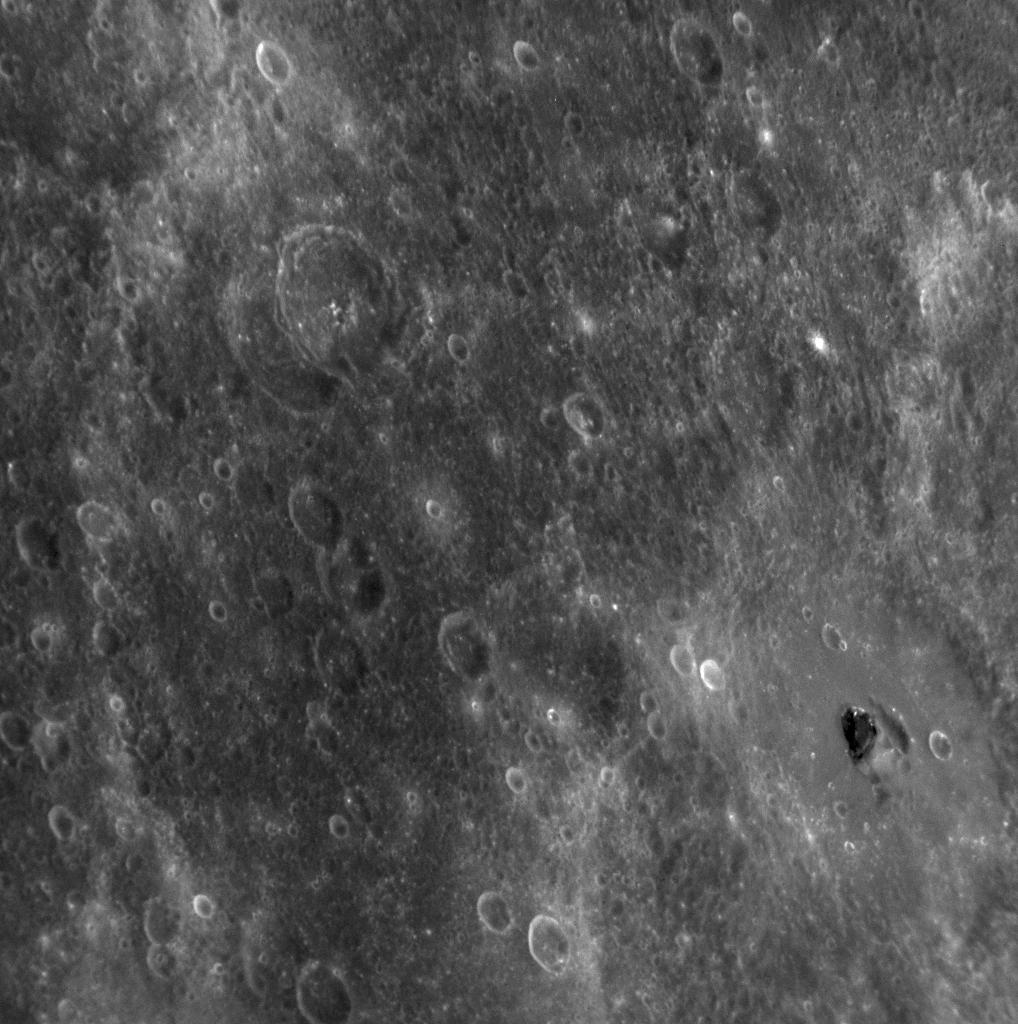
Several areas on Mercury are extremely dark, such as a small crater within Hemingway crater in the lower right.

The geology of Mercury is the scientific study of the surface, crust, and interior of the planet Mercury. It emphasizes the composition, structure, history, and physical processes that shape the planet. It is analogous to the field of terrestrial geology. In planetary science, the term geology is used in its broadest sense to mean the study of the solid parts of planets and moons. The term incorporates aspects of geophysics, geochemistry, mineralogy, geodesy, and cartography.

Historically, Mercury has been the least understood of all the terrestrial planets in the Solar System. This stems largely from its proximity to the Sun which makes reaching it with spacecraft technically challenging and Earth-based observations difficult. For decades, the principal source of geologic information about Mercury came from the 2,700 images taken by the Mariner 10 spacecraft during three flybys of the planet from 1974 to 1975. These images covered about 45% of the planet's surface, but many of them were unsuitable for detailed geologic investigation because of high sun angles which made it hard to determine surface morphology and topography. This dearth of information was greatly alleviated by the Mercury Surface, Space Environment, Geochemistry, and Ranging (MESSENGER) spacecraft which between 2008 and 2015 collected over 291,000 images covering the entire planet, along with a wealth of other scientific data. The European Space Agency's (ESA's) BepiColombo spacecraft, scheduled to go into orbit around Mercury in 2026, is expected to help answer many of the remaining questions about Mercury's geology.

Mercury's surface is dominated by impact craters, basaltic rock and smooth plains, many of them a result of flood volcanism, similar in some respects to the lunar maria, and locally by pyroclastic deposits. Other notable features include vents which appear to be the source of magma-carved valleys, often-grouped irregular-shaped depressions termed "hollows" that are believed to be the result of collapsed magma chambers, scarps indicative of thrust faulting, and mineral deposits (possibly ice) inside craters at the poles. Although Mercury has been long thought geologically inactive, new evidence suggests there may still be some level of activity.

Mercury's density implies a solid iron-rich core that accounts for about 60% of its volume (75% of its radius). Mercury's magnetic equator is shifted nearly 20% of the planet's radius towards the north, the largest ratio of all planets. This shift suggests there being one or more iron-rich molten layers surrounding the core producing a dynamo effect similar to that of Earth. Additionally, the offset magnetic dipole may result in uneven surface weathering by the solar wind, knocking more surface particles up into the southern exosphere and transporting them for deposit in the north. Scientists are gathering telemetry to determine if such is the case.

== Difficulties in exploration ==
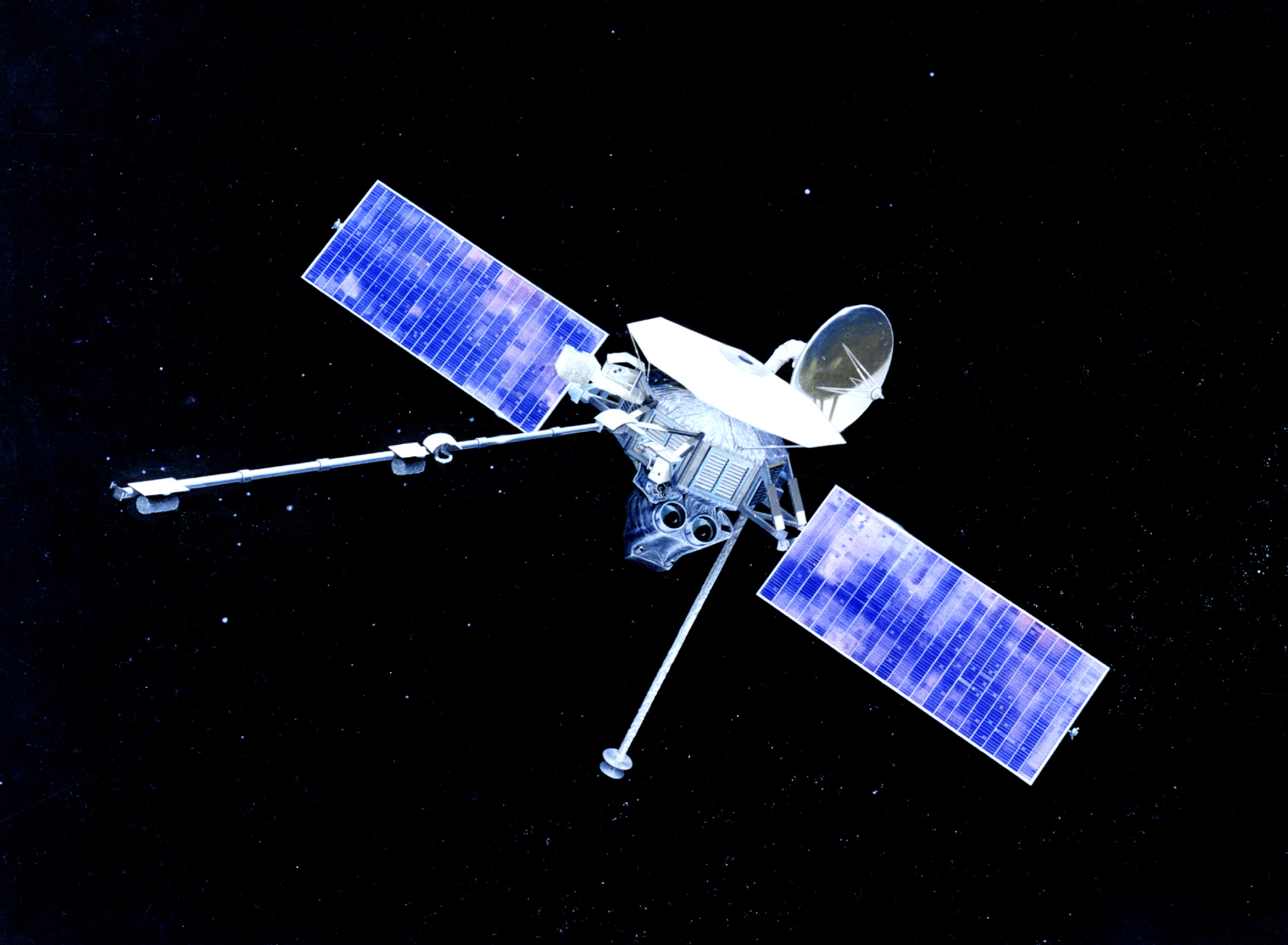
Mariner 10 probe

Reaching Mercury from Earth poses significant technical challenges, because the planet orbits so much closer to the Sun than does the Earth. A Mercury-bound spacecraft launched from Earth must travel 91 million kilometers into the Sun's gravitational potential well. Starting from the Earth's orbital speed of 30 km/s, the change in velocity (delta-v) the spacecraft must make to enter into a Hohmann transfer orbit that passes near Mercury is large compared to other planetary missions. The potential energy liberated by moving down the Sun's potential well becomes kinetic energy; requiring another large delta-v to do anything other than rapidly pass by Mercury. In order to land safely or enter a stable orbit the spacecraft must rely entirely on rocket motors because Mercury has negligible atmosphere. A direct trip to Mercury actually requires more rocket fuel than that required to escape the Solar System completely. As a result, only three space probes, Mariner 10, MESSENGER, and BepiColombo have visited Mercury so far.

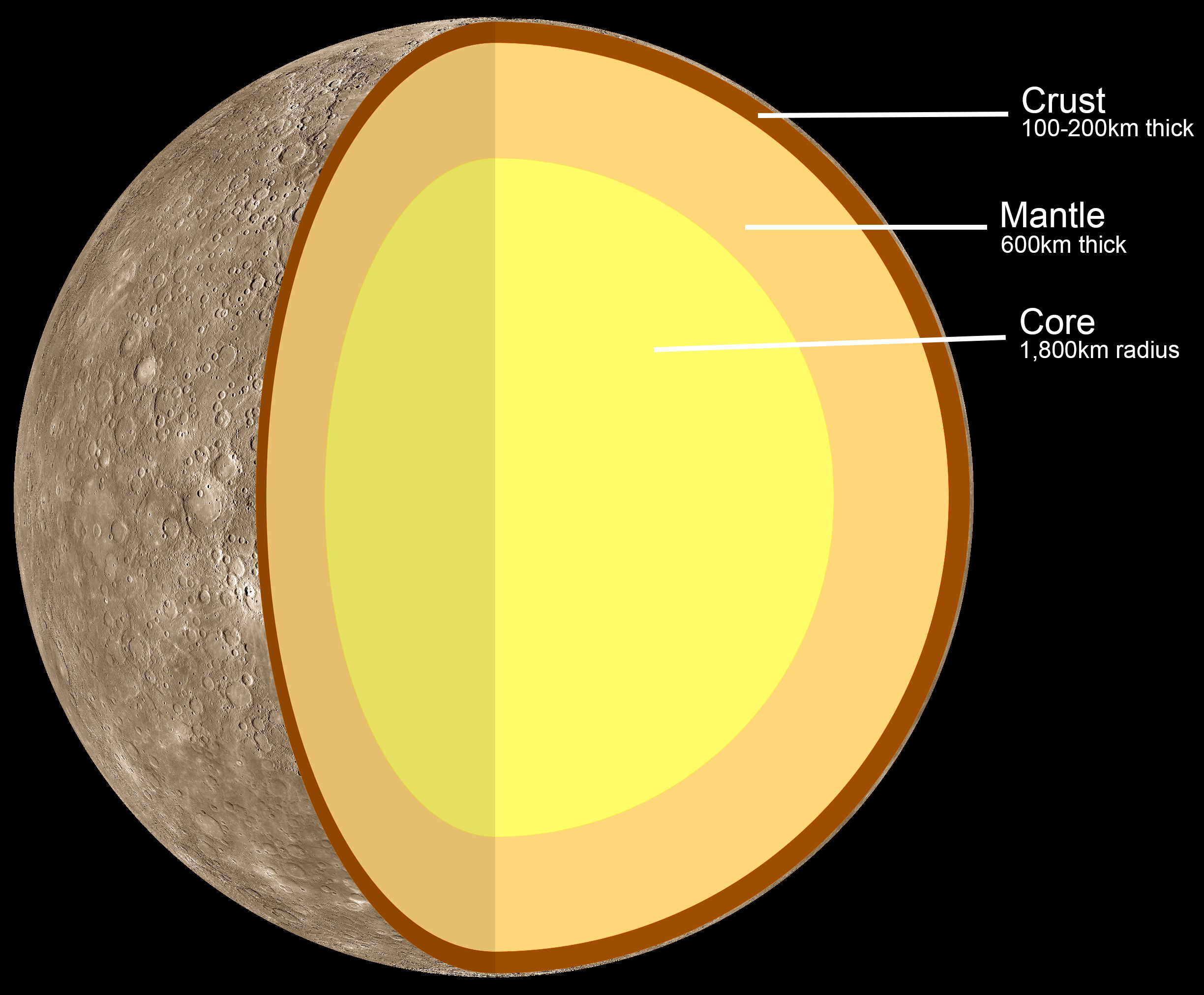
Internal structure of Mercury

Furthermore, the space environment near Mercury is demanding, posing the double dangers to spacecraft of intense solar radiation and high temperatures.

Historically, a second obstacle has been that Mercury's period of rotation is a slow 58 Earth days, so that spacecraft flybys are restricted to viewing only a single illuminated hemisphere. Unfortunately, even though Mariner 10 space probe flew past Mercury three times during 1974 and 1975, it observed the same area during each pass. This was because Mariner 10's orbital period was almost exactly 3 sidereal Mercury days, and the same face of the planet was lit at each of the close approaches. As a result, less than 45% of the planet's surface was mapped.

Earth-based observations are made difficult by Mercury's constant proximity to the Sun. This has several consequences:

1. Whenever the sky is dark enough for viewing through telescopes, Mercury is always already near the horizon, where viewing conditions are poor anyway due to atmospheric factors.
2. The Hubble Space Telescope and other space observatories are usually prevented from pointing close to the Sun for safety reasons (Erroneously pointing such sensitive instruments at the Sun is likely to cause permanent damage).

== Surface features ==
Mercury's surface is overall similar in appearance to that of the Moon, with extensive mare-like plains and heavily cratered terrains similar to the lunar highlands and made locally by accumulations of pyroclastic deposits.

Topography
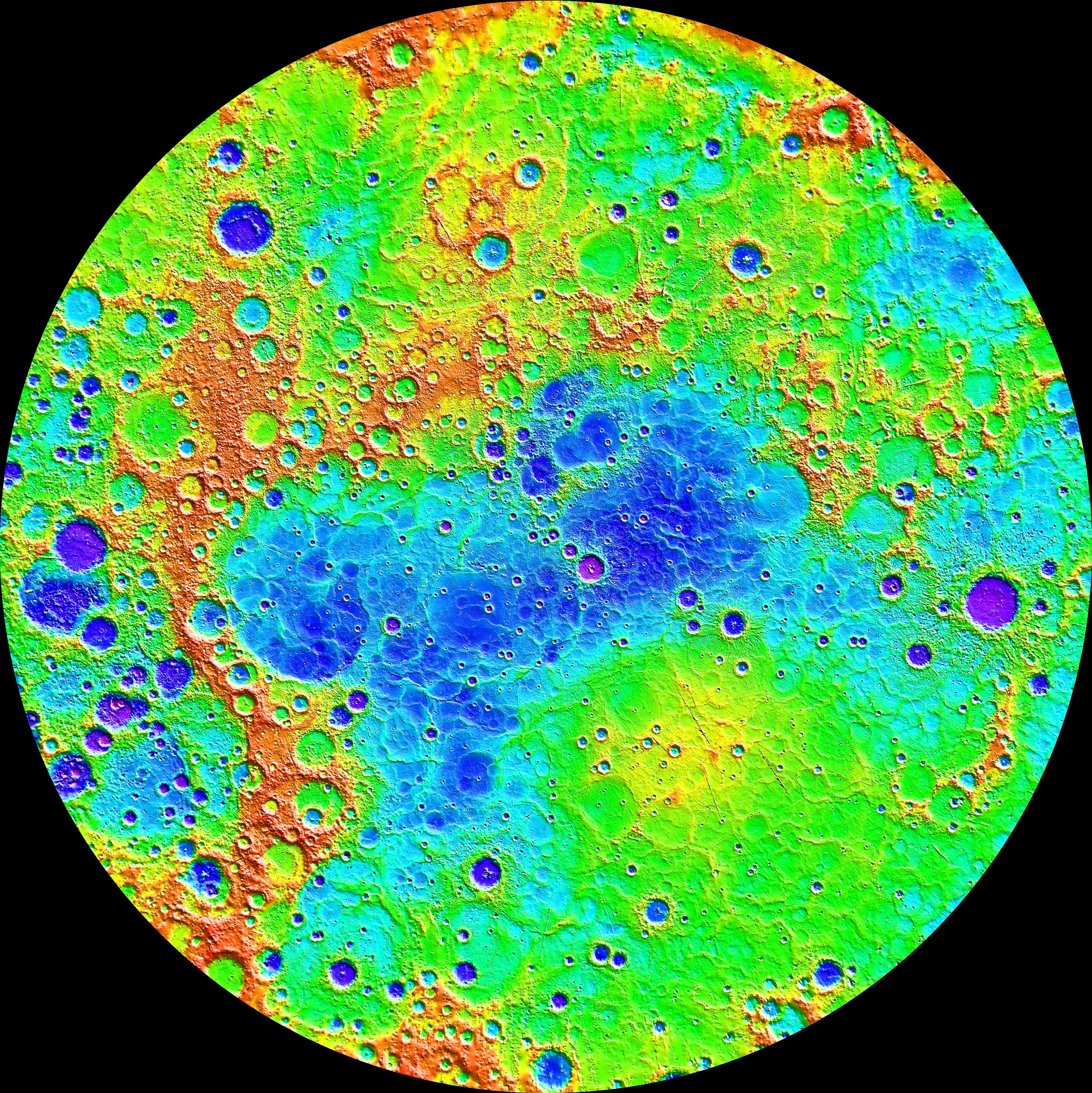
Map of Mercury's northern hemisphere by the MLA instrument on MESSENGER
lowest (purple) to 10 km (6.2 mi) highest (red).

=== Boulders ===
Mercury compared to the Moon has a rarity of boulders; about thirty times fewer boulders are found on Mercury than on the Moon. An explanation for this rarity is that the lifespan of Mercury's boulders can be less than the life span of boulders on the Moon (around 100 million years).

Boulders that have been found on Mercury as associated with fresh impact craters that are hundreds of meters in diameter or larger.

=== Impact basins and craters ===
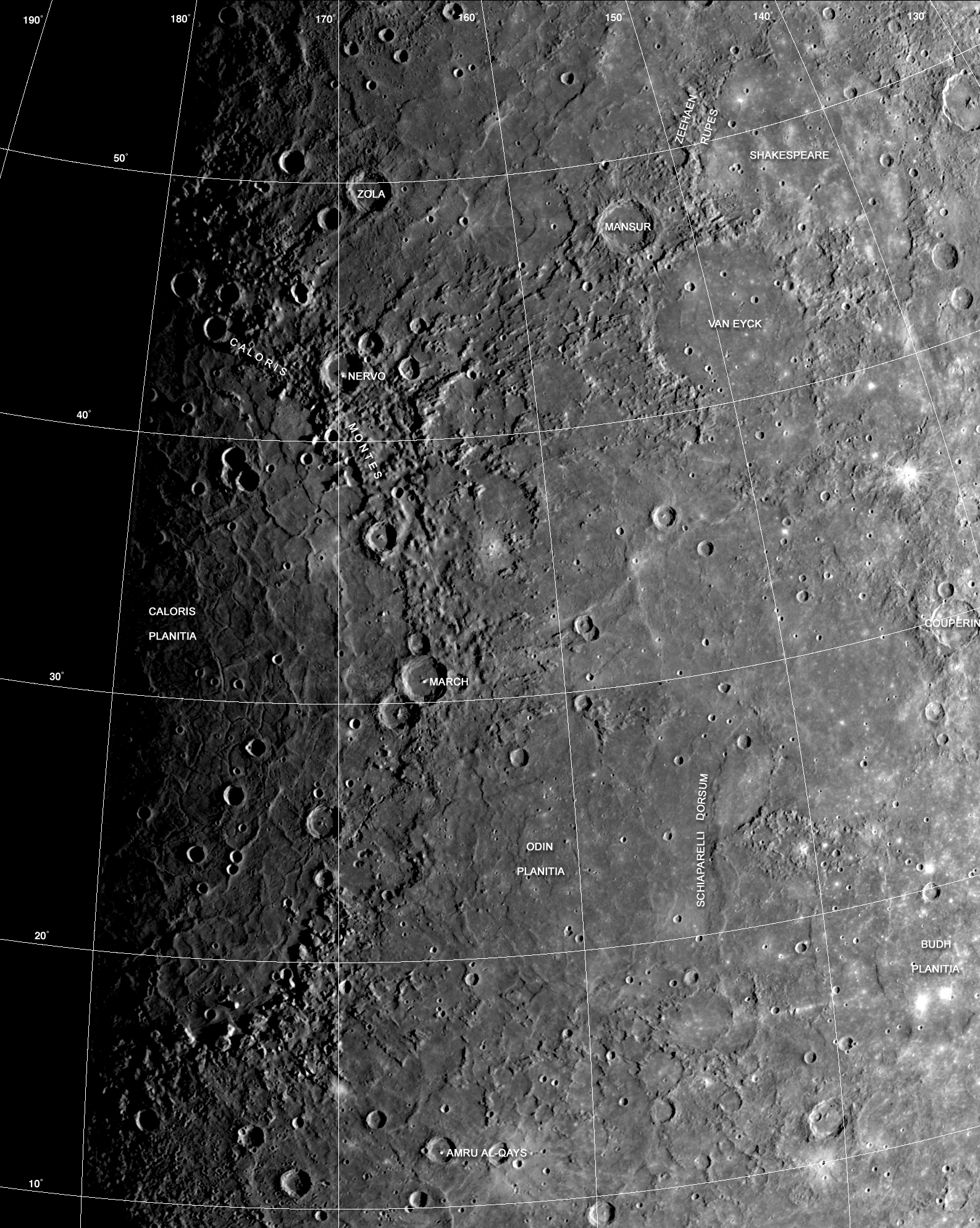
Mercury's Caloris Basin is one of the largest impact features in the Solar System

Craters on Mercury range in diameter from small bowl-shaped craters to multi-ringed impact basins hundreds of kilometers across. They appear in all states of degradation, from relatively fresh rayed-craters, to highly degraded crater remnants. Mercurian craters differ subtly from Lunar craters – the extent of their ejecta blankets is much smaller, which is a consequence of the 2.5 times stronger surface gravity on Mercury.

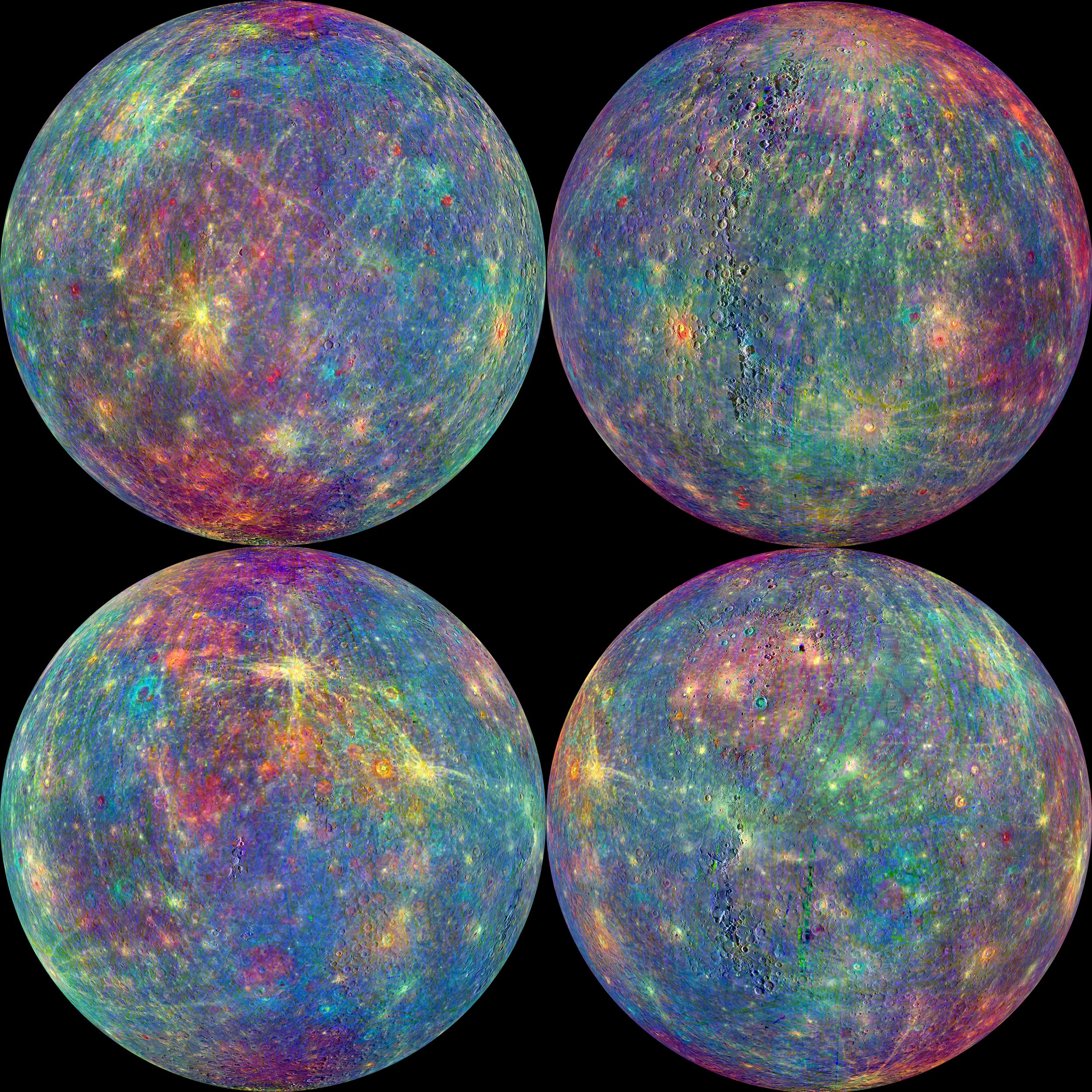
MASCS spectrum scan of Mercury's surface by MESSENGER

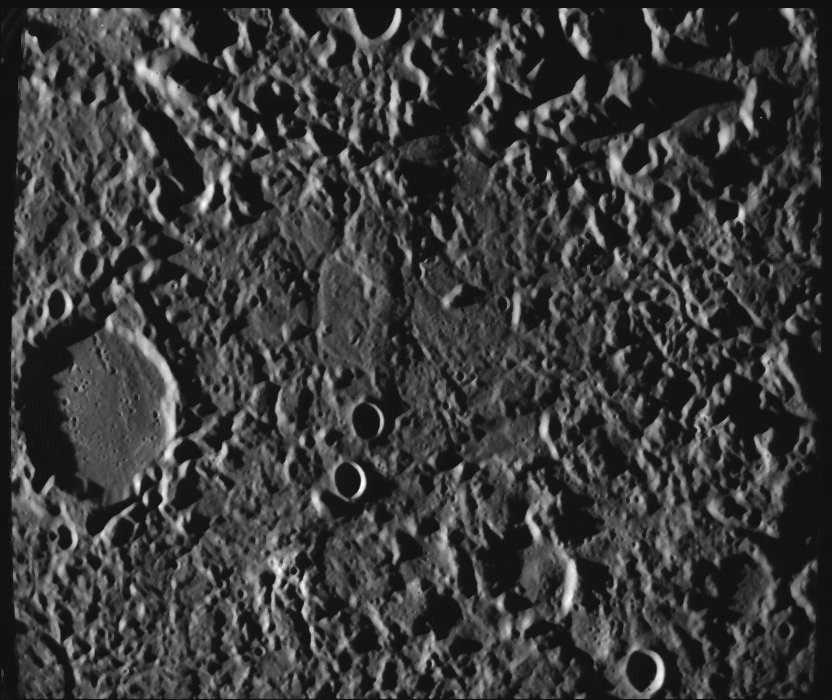
The so-called "Weird Terrain" formed by the Caloris Basin impact at its antipodal point

The largest known crater is the enormous Caloris Basin, with a diameter of 1,550 km. A basin of comparable size, tentatively named Skinakas Basin had been postulated from low resolution Earth-based observations of the non-Mariner-imaged hemisphere, but has not been observed in MESSENGER imagery of the corresponding terrain. The impact which created the Caloris Basin was so powerful that its effects are seen on a global scale. It caused lava eruptions and left a concentric ring over 2 km tall surrounding the impact crater. At the antipode of the Caloris Basin lies a large region of unusual, hilly and furrowed terrain, sometimes called "Weird Terrain". The favoured hypothesis for the origin of this geomorphologic unit is that shock waves generated during the impact traveled around the planet, and when they converged at the basin's antipode (180 degrees away) the high stresses were capable of fracturing the surface. A much less favoured idea was that this terrain formed as a result of the convergence of ejecta at this basin's antipode. Furthermore, the formation of the Caloris Basin appears to have produced a shallow depression concentric around the basin, which was later filled by the smooth plains (see below).

Other notable basins include the 400 km wide, multi-ring, Tolstoj Basin which has an ejecta blanket extending up to 500 km from its rim, and its floor has been filled by smooth plains materials. Beethoven Basin also has a similar-sized ejecta blanket and a 625 km diameter rim. These were originally imaged by Mariner 10. Another large basin later imaged by MESSENGER is Rembrandt, which is the second-largest basin after Caloris.

As on the Moon, fresh craters on Mercury show prominent bright ray systems. These are made by ejected debris, which tend to be brighter while they remain relatively fresh because of a lesser amount of space weathering than the surrounding older terrain.

==== Pit-floor craters ====
Some impact craters on Mercury have non-circular, irregularly shaped depressions or pits on their floors. Such craters have been termed pit-floor craters, and MESSENGER team members have suggested that such pits formed by the collapse of subsurface magma chambers. If this suggestion is correct, the pits are evidence of volcanic processes at work on Mercury. Pit craters are rimless, often irregularly shaped, and steep-sided, and they display no associated ejecta or lava flows but are typically distinctive in color. For example, the pits of Praxiteles have an orange hue. Thought to be evidence of shallow magmatic activity, pit craters may have formed when subsurface magma drained elsewhere and left a roof area unsupported, leading to collapse and the formation of the pit. Major craters exhibiting these features include Beckett, Gibran, Lermontov, Picasso, and Navoi, among others. It was suggested that these pits with associated brighter and redder deposits may be pyroclastic deposits caused by explosive volcanism.

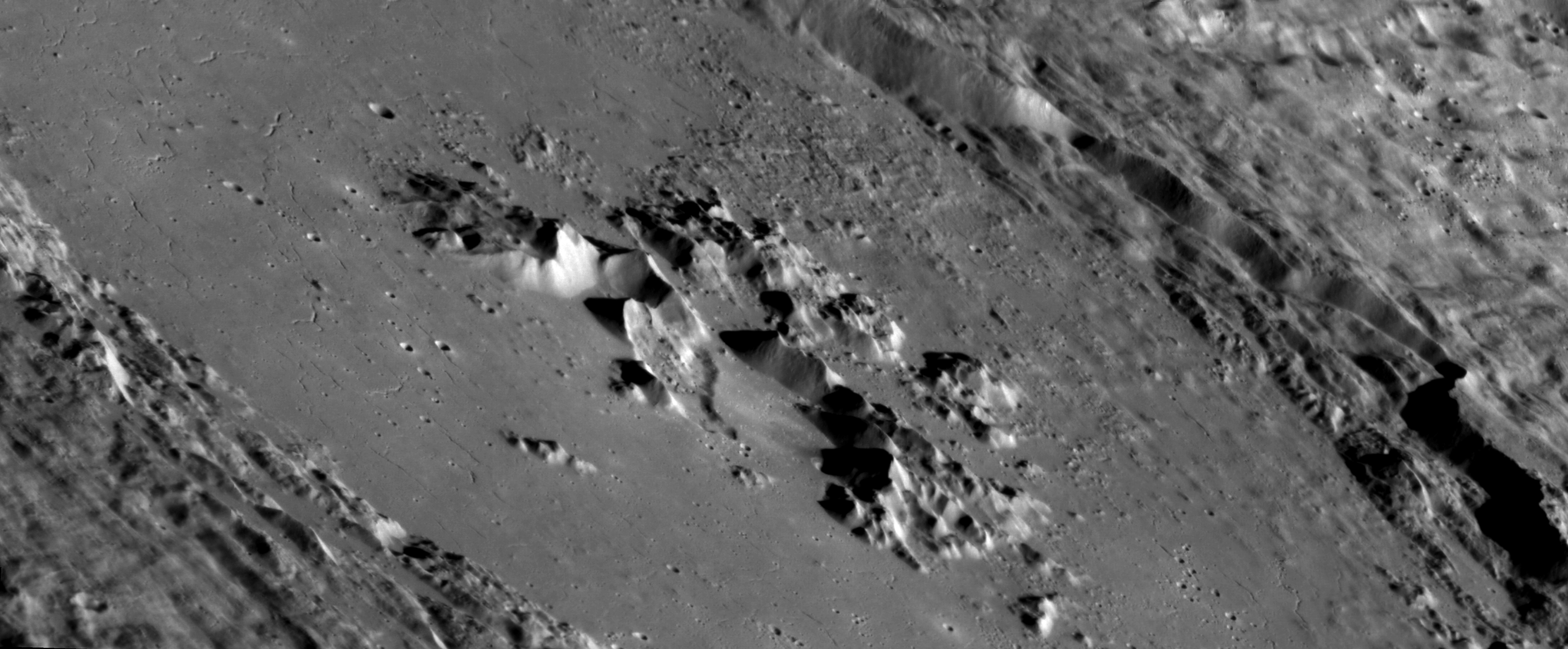
Interior of Abedin crater

=== Plains ===
There are two geologically distinct plains units on Mercury:

- Intercrater plains are the oldest visible surface, predating the heavily cratered terrain. They are gently rolling or hilly and occur in the regions between larger craters. The intercrater plains appear to have obliterated many earlier craters, and show a general paucity of smaller craters below about 30 km in diameter. It is not clear whether they are of volcanic or impact origin. The intercrater plains are distributed roughly uniformly over the entire surface of the planet.
- Smooth plains are widespread flat areas resembling the lunar maria, which fill depressions of various sizes. Notably, they fill a wide ring surrounding the Caloris Basin. An appreciable difference to the lunar maria is that the smooth plains of Mercury have the same albedo as the older intercrater plains. Despite a lack of unequivocally volcanic features, their localisation and lobate-shaped colour units strongly support a volcanic origin. All the Mercurian smooth plains formed significantly later than the Caloris basin, as evidenced by appreciably smaller crater densities than on the Caloris ejecta blanket.

The floor of the Caloris Basin is also filled by a geologically distinct flat plain, broken up by ridges and fractures in a roughly polygonal pattern. It is not clear whether they are volcanic lavas induced by the impact, or a large sheet of impact melt.

=== Tectonic features ===
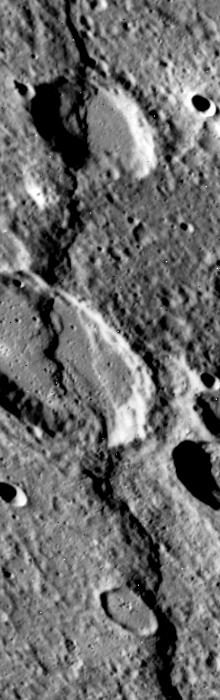
Discovery Rupes.

One unusual feature of the planet's surface is the numerous compression folds which crisscross the plains. It is thought that as the planet's interior cooled, it contracted and its surface began to deform. The folds can be seen on top of other features, such as craters and smoother plains, indicating that they are more recent. Mercury's surface is also flexed by significant tidal bulges raised by the Sun—the Sun's tides on Mercury are about 17% stronger than the Moon's on Earth.

=== Faculae ===
Faculae on Mercury are bright areas often surrounding irregular depressions. They are generally interpreted to be pyroclastic in nature. The faculae on Mercury are all named using words in different languages meaning snake.

=== Terminology ===
Non-crater surface features are given the following names:

- Albedo features – areas of markedly different reflectivity
- Dorsa — ridges (see List of ridges on Mercury)
- Montes — mountains (see List of mountains on Mercury)
- Planitiae — plains (see List of plains on Mercury)
- Rupes — scarps (see List of scarps on Mercury)
- Valles — valleys (see List of valleys on Mercury)

== High-albedo polar patches and possible presence of ice ==
The first radar observations of Mercury were carried out by the radiotelescopes at Arecibo (Puerto Rico) and Goldstone (California, United States), with assistance from the U.S. National Radio Astronomy Observatory Very Large Array (VLA) facility in New Mexico. The transmissions sent from the NASA Deep Space Network site at Goldstone were at a power level of 460 kW at 8.51 GHz; the signals received by the VLA multi-dish array detected points of radar reflectivity (radar luminosity) with depolarized waves from Mercury's north pole.

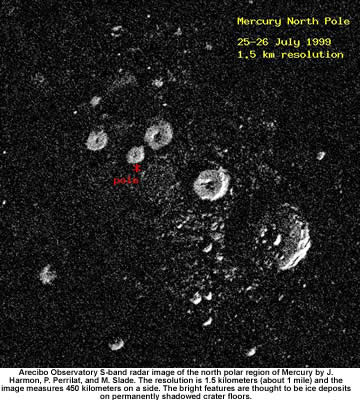
Radar image of Mercury's north pole.

Radar maps of the surface of the planet were made using the Arecibo radiotelescope. The survey was conducted with 420 kW UHF band (2.4 GHz) radio waves which allowed for a 15 km resolution. This study not only confirmed the existence of the zones of high reflectivity and depolarization, but also found a number of new areas (bringing the total to 20) and was even able to survey the poles. It has been postulated that surface ice may be responsible for these high luminosity levels, as the silicate rocks that compose most of the surface of Mercury have exactly the opposite effect on luminosity.

In spite of its proximity to the Sun, Mercury may have surface ice, since temperatures near the poles are constantly below freezing point: On the polar plains, the temperature does not rise above −106 °C. Craters at Mercury's higher latitudes (discovered by radar surveys from Earth as well) may be deep enough to shield the ice from direct sunlight. Inside the craters, where there is no solar light, temperatures fall to −171 °C.

Despite sublimation into the vacuum of space, the temperature in the permanently shadowed region is so low that this sublimation is slow enough to potentially preserve deposited ice for billions of years.

At the South Pole, the location of a large zone of high reflectivity coincides with the location of the Chao Meng-Fu crater, and other small craters containing reflective areas have also been identified. At the North Pole, a number of craters smaller than Chao-Meng Fu have these reflective properties.

The strength of the radar reflections seen on Mercury are small compared to that which would occur with pure ice. This may be due to powder deposition that does not cover the surface of the crater completely or other causes, e.g. a thin overlying surface layer. However, the evidence for ice on Mercury is not definitive. The anomalous reflective properties could also be due to the existence of deposits of metallic sulfates or other materials with high reflectance.

=== Possible origin of ice ===
Mercury is not unique in having craters that stand in permanent shadow; at the south pole of Earth's Moon there is a large crater (Aitken) where some possible signs of the presence of ice have been seen (although their interpretation is disputed). It is thought by astronomers that ice on both Mercury and the Moon must have originated from external sources, mostly impacting comets. These are known to contain large amounts, or a majority, of ice. It is therefore conceivable for meteorite impacts to have deposited water in the permanently shadow craters, where it would remain unwarmed for possibly billions of years due to the lack of an atmosphere to efficiently conduct heat and stable orientation of Mercury's rotation axis.

Mercury
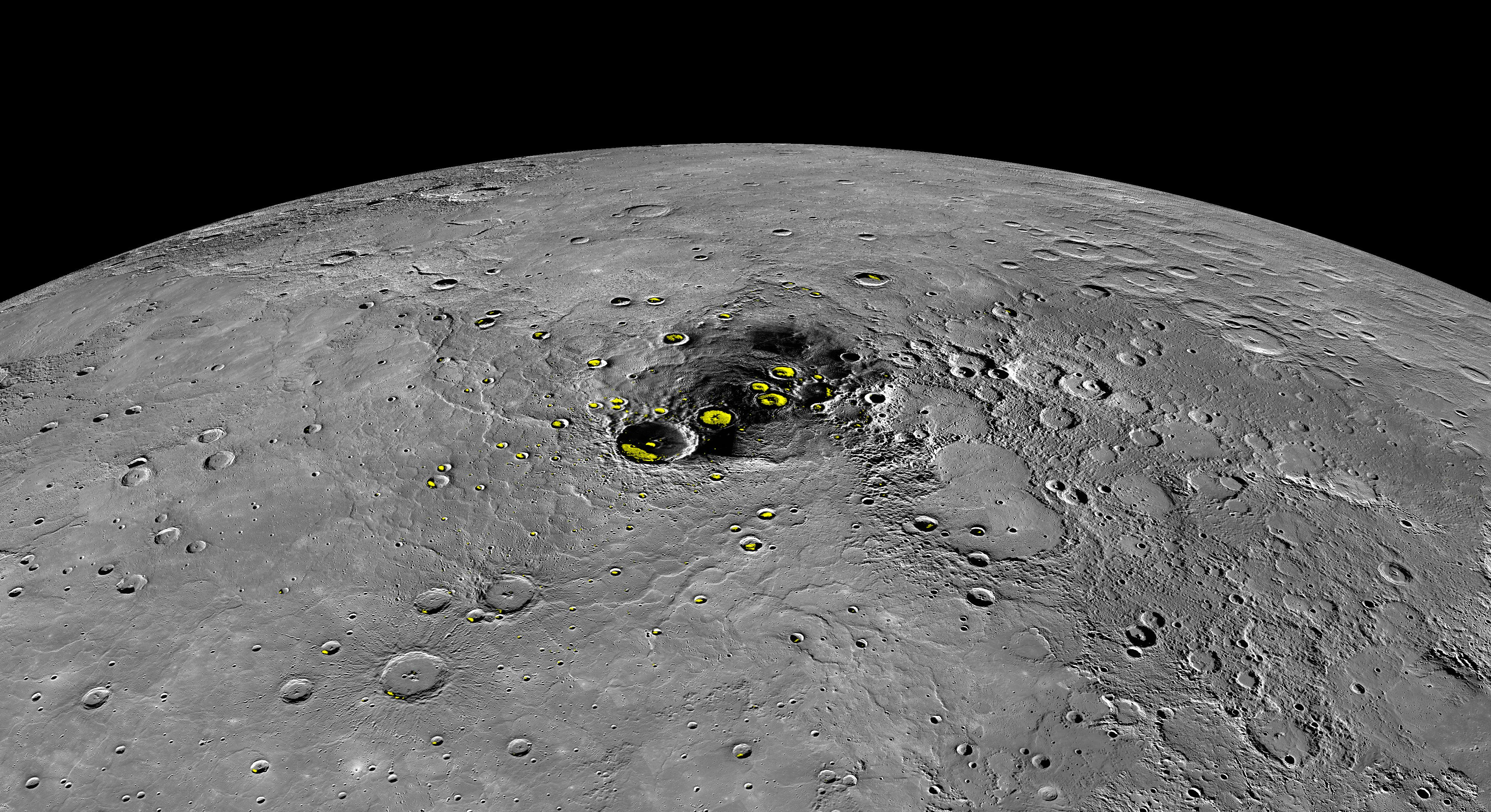
Water ice (yellow) at Mercury's north polar region

== Geochemistry ==
Mercury has the most reducing chemistry of any planet in the Solar System.

== Geological history ==
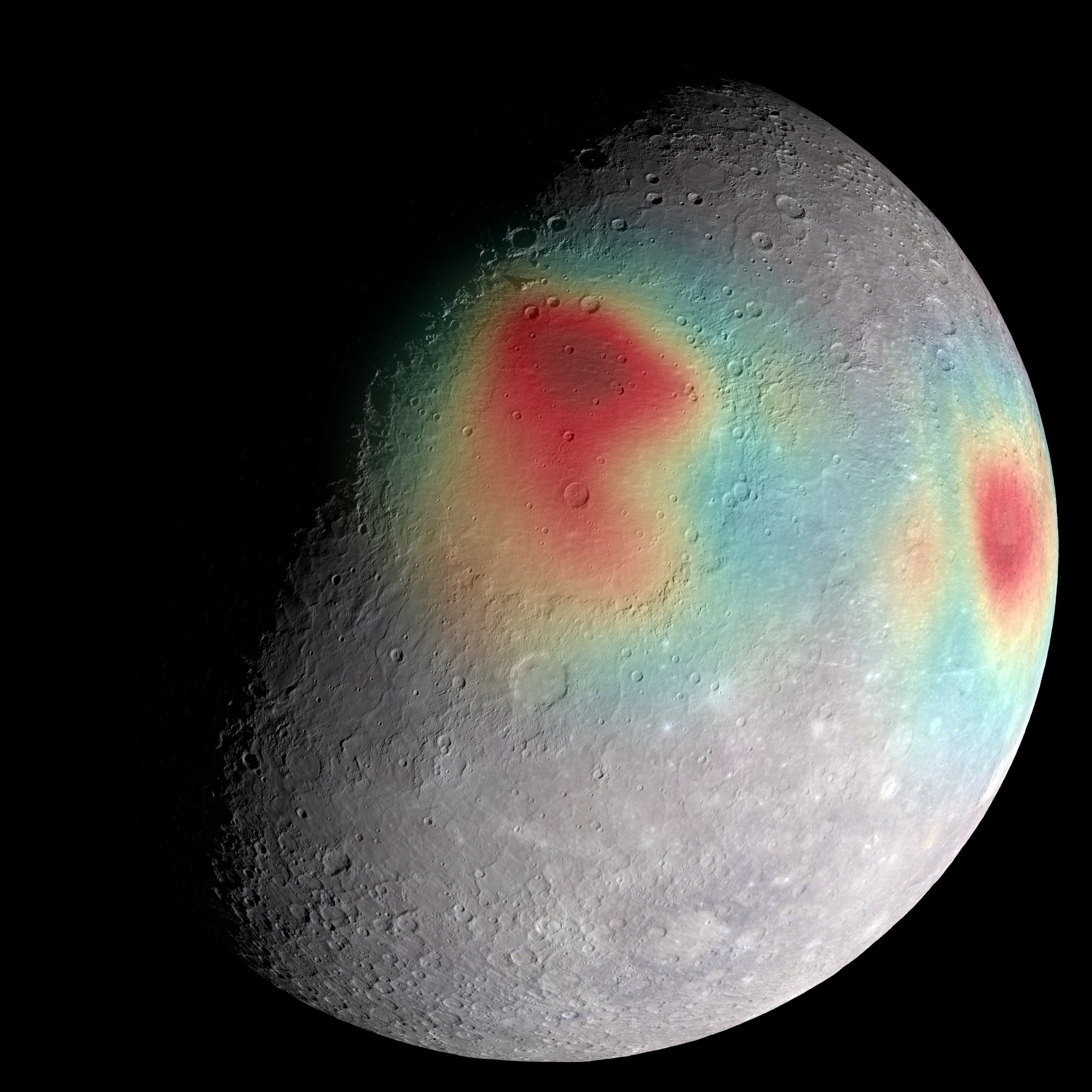
Mercury – Gravity Anomalies – mass concentrations (red) suggest subsurface structure and evolution.

The formation of the terrestrial planets began about 4.57 billion years ago when solids first condensed out of the protoplanetary disc. After planetesimals grow to a size of several kilometers, runaway oligarchic growth builds Moon- to Mars-sized planetary embryos as gas in the disc dissipates. The final terrestrial planets form from stochastic giant impacts over hundreds of millions of years. Aspects of planet formation, including the physics of planetesimal growth and the chemistry of the disc, are poorly constrained. As a result, the origin of Mercury and its characteristics – such as its large core and internal chemistry – are not well understood. In some models of the protoplanetary disc's chemistry, the inner part of the disc (within 0.5 AU) was dry and very chemically reduced and provides most of the material to form Mercury. Other models propose that Mercury formed as far away as Mars's current position to explain the presence of volatiles like potassium. Collision models involve Mercury and another protoplanet colliding and removing much of the mantle. Several processes likely contributed to Mercury's characteristics during its formation.

Mercury's following early geologic history featured the formation of large impact basins, widespread early volcanism, global compressional tectonics, and an early active dynamo. As the planet cooled, volcanic activity slowed and its surface became dominated by ongoing global contraction, cratering, and the formation of hollows. Mercury's geologic history is divided into five stratigraphic eras. From oldest to youngest, these are: the pre-Tolstojan (before ~4,000 Ma), Tolstojan (~4,000–3,900 Ma), Calorian (~3,900 – 1700±200 Ma), Mansurian (1700±200 – 280±60 Ma), and Kuiperian (280±60 Ma to present). Their ages are based on relative dating, and uncertainties remain for the onset of various eras.

The very early pre-Tolstojan was likely marked by the presence of a magma ocean and possibly a short-lived primary atmosphere composed mainly of methane and hydrogen. As the magma ocean cooled, a flotation crust of graphite may have formed. However, unlike the Moon, whose crust was formed with limited effusive volcanism, Mercury's crust was also constructed by widespread volcanism. Many large impact basins formed during the pre-Tolstojan, such as Goethe, Shakespeare, and Sobkou Planitia. The extensive intercrater plains also began to form during this era and into the Tolstojan. The Tolstojan's beginning is characterized by the creation of the Goya Formation surrounding the Tolstoj basin. The Calorian's beginning is defined by the Caloris impact, which extensively resurfaced Mercury's surface. The majority of volcanic activity appears to have ended during the Calorian, though isolated effusive eruptions may have occurred as recently as 1 billion years ago and possible pyroclastic deposits of late Mansurian to early Keplerian age have been identified. Chaos terrain continued forming as late as 1.8 billion years ago in the late Calorian. The chaos terrain's formation may have involved volatiles, perhaps giving rise to potentially habitable conditions underground episodically. The Mansurian is characterized by somewhat degraded craters with no bright rays. The youngest period, the Kuiperian, encompasses the formation of bright-rayed craters such as Kuiper. Both eras correspond to decreased geological activity dominated by cratering, though small, young scarps show that tectonic deformation caused by global contraction is ongoing. The Kuiperian also encompasses the formation of hollows.

=== Timeline ===
Mercurian time periods (millions of years ago)

== See also ==
- Atmosphere of Mercury – Gas layer surrounding planet Mercury
- List of craters on Mercury
- List of geological features on Mercury
