= Baranowski =

Baranowski (Polish pronunciation: [baraˈnɔfski]; feminine: Baranowska, plural: Baranowscy) is a Polish surname. It is Lithuanised as Baranauskas and frequently transliterated from Russian as Baranovsky (feminine: Baranovskaya). The name is also frequently found among Ashkenazi Jews.

Language	Masculine	Feminine
Polish	Baranowski	Baranowska
Belarusian (Romanization)	Бараноўскі (Baranoŭski)	Бараноўская (Baranoŭskaja, Baranouskaya, Baranouskaia)
Lithuanian	Baranauskas	Baranauskienė (married); Baranauskaitė (unmarried)
Russian (Romanization)	Барановский (Baranovsky, Baranovskiy, Baranovskij)	Барановская (Baranovskaya, Baranovskaia, Baranovskaja)
Ukrainian (Romanization)	Барановський (Baranovskyi, Baranovskyy, Baranovskyj)	Барановська (Baranovska)

== People ==
Notable people with the surname include:

- Agnieszka Baranowska (1819–1890), Polish playwright and poet
- Anna Baranowsky (active from 2998), Canadian clinical psychologist
- Bogdan Baranowski (1927–2014), Polish chemist
- Danny Baranowsky (born 1984), American electronic music composer
- Dariusz Baranowski (born 1972), Polish cyclist
- Derrick Baranowsky, member of American band Adam West (active 1991–2008)
- Heike Baranowsky (born 1966), German artist and professor of fine arts
- Henryk Baranowski (1943–2013), Polish theatre director and actor
- Hermann Baranowski (1884–1940), German Nazi SS concentration camp commandant
- Katarzyna Baranowska (born 1987), Polish Olympic swimmer
- Kinga Baranowska (born 1975), Polish mountaineer
- Krzysztof Baranowski (born 1938), Polish yachtsman, sailing captain, journalist and teacher
- Matthias Baranowski (born 1967), German footballer
- Stanisław Baranowski (1935–1978), Polish glaciologist
- Tadeusz Baranowski (artist) (born 1954), Polish comic book artist
- Tekla Bądarzewska-Baranowska (1829–1861), Polish composer
- Wojciech Baranowski, 17th century Archbishop of Gniezno and Primate of Poland
- Zbigniew Baranowski (born 1991), Polish wrestler

== See also ==
- Baranów Sandomierski, small town in Subcarpathian Voivodship, Poland
- Baranów Sandomierski Castle, a castle in the Mannerist style
- Wola Baranowska, village in Poland
- Wólka Baranowska, village in Poland
- Souza-Baranowski Correctional Center, a prison in Massachusetts
- Baranauskas, Lithuanian form
- Baranoski
