= Exploration of Mercury =

Overview of the exploration of the planet Mercury

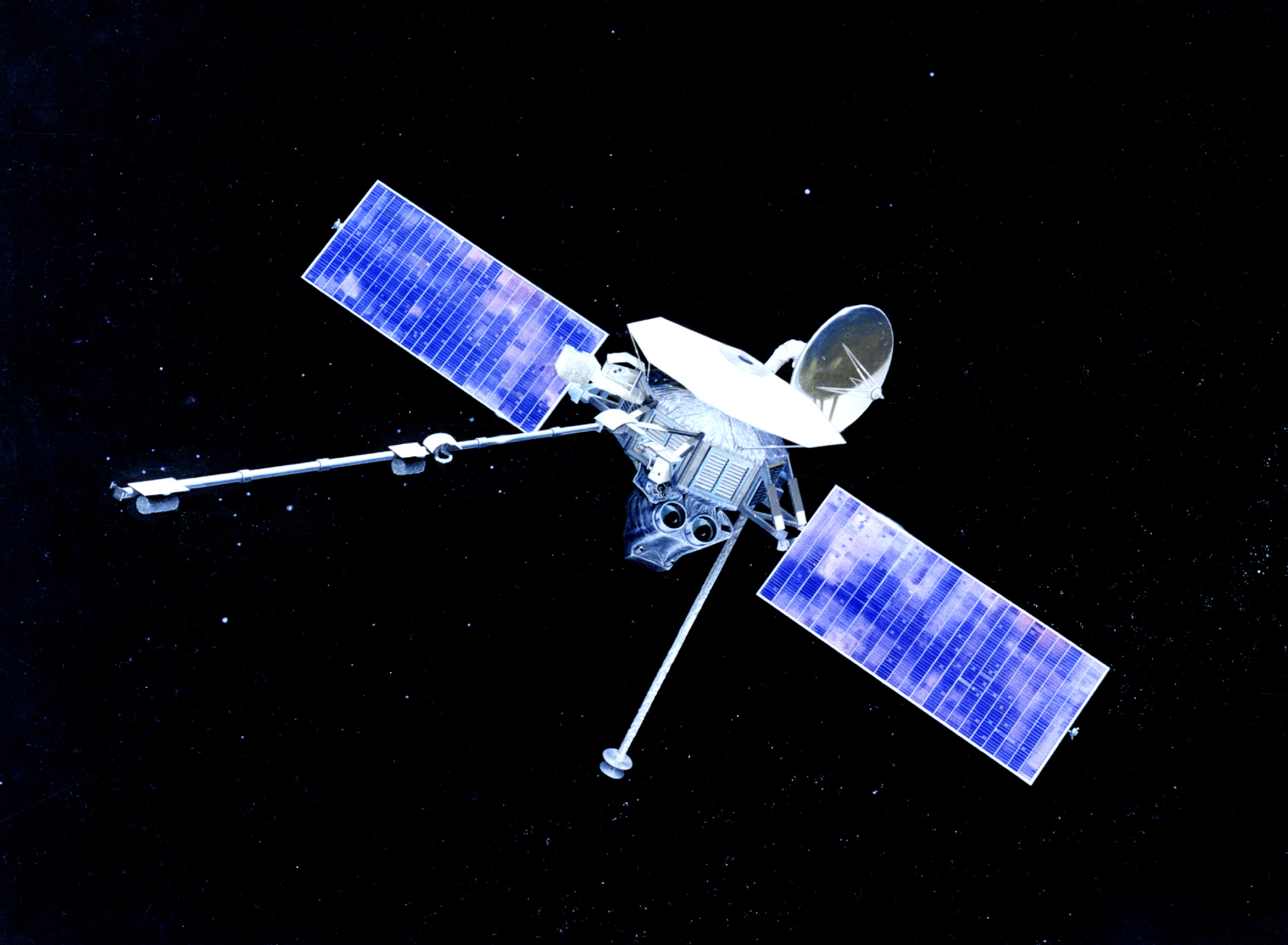
Artist's depiction of Mariner 10, the first spacecraft to visit Mercury

The exploration of Mercury has been limited, making it the least explored of the inner planets. It began with the Mariner 10 flybys in 1974 and 1975, continued with the MESSENGER orbiter from 2011 to 2015, and is set to advance with the BepiColombo mission, which is scheduled to enter orbit in November 2026. Missions to Mercury are challenging because of the high fuel requirements for reaching the planet and entering orbit, as well as the extreme thermal environment near the Sun.

Mariner 10 returned the first close-up images of Mercury and discovered its magnetic field. MESSENGER became the first spacecraft to orbit the planet, mapped its entire surface, and found evidence of water ice in permanently shadowed polar craters. BepiColombo, a joint mission by the European Space Agency (ESA) and the Japan Aerospace Exploration Agency (JAXA), is designed to build on and complement MESSENGER's findings. After a series of gravity-assist flybys, it is expected to begin its primary orbital science mission in 2027. Several other missions, including landers, have been proposed but have not yet been approved.

== Technical requirements ==
Reaching Mercury from Earth poses significant technical challenges because the planet orbits much closer to the Sun. A spacecraft traveling to Mercury must cover more than 91 million km (57 million mi) while descending deep into the Sun's gravitational well. Mercury's orbital speed is 47.4 km/s (29.5 mi/s), compared with Earth's 29.8 km/s (18.5 mi/s). Consequently, a spacecraft requires a larger change in velocity (delta-v) to reach Mercury and enter orbit than is typically needed for a mission to Mars.

As a spacecraft moves closer to the Sun, gravitational potential energy is converted into kinetic energy, increasing its speed. The spacecraft must therefore reduce its speed substantially to enter orbit around Mercury rather than fly past it. Gravity assists, including one or more flybys of Venus, can provide part of the required delta-v. However, entering a stable orbit or landing safely requires rocket propulsion because Mercury's negligible atmosphere makes aerobraking impractical. A mission to Mercury can require more propellant than escaping the Solar System from Earth's vicinity. These challenges have limited exploration of the planet; only three space probes have visited Mercury. One proposed alternative would use a solar sail to reach an orbit around the Sun synchronized with Mercury's orbital period.

== Flyby missions ==
=== Mariner 10 (1974 and 1975) ===
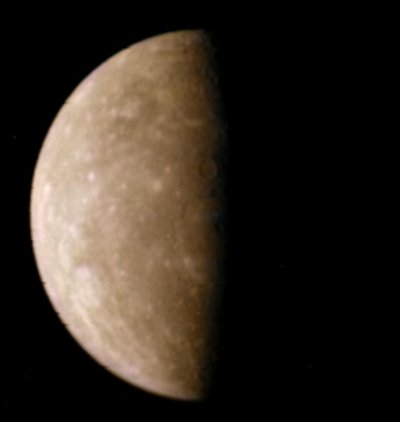
Mercury as seen by Mariner 10 in March 1975

The first spacecraft to explore Mercury was Mariner 10, which flew past the planet in 1974 and 1975. The mission was designed to study the atmospheres, surfaces, and physical characteristics of Mercury and Venus and cost less than US$98 million. Mariner 10 launched from Cape Canaveral on November 3, 1973.

Because reaching orbit around Mercury requires substantial fuel, Mariner 10 followed a trajectory around the Sun and used Venus's gravity to alter its path. The spacecraft made its first close flyby of Mercury on March 29, 1974, becoming the first probe to observe the planet at close range. Its orbit around the Sun was configured so that Mercury completed two orbits for every spacecraft orbit, allowing further encounters. Mariner 10 flew past Mercury again on September 21, 1974, and March 16, 1975. Because the same side of Mercury was illuminated during each flyby, the spacecraft photographed only about 45 percent of the planet's surface.

The mission ended on March 24, 1975, when Mariner 10 ran out of gas for its attitude-control system. Without its nitrogen thrusters, the spacecraft could no longer maintain its orientation, so controllers commanded it to shut down its transmitter.

Mariner 10's observations produced two major discoveries. First, the spacecraft detected Mercury's magnetic field, which was unexpectedly similar to Earth's despite Mercury's slow rotation. Second, its images revealed a heavily cratered surface, providing evidence that the planet had undergone little significant modification of its crust. This finding raised questions about the origin of Mercury's magnetic field. Scientists had attributed planetary magnetic fields to a dynamo effect generated by a molten core, but the apparent lack of crustal modification complicated their understanding of Mercury's geological history. The images also helped scientists investigate the planet's composition and age.

== Orbiter missions ==
=== MESSENGER (2011–2015) ===
Animation of MESSENGER's trajectory around Mercury from March 15, 2011 to December 30, 2014 MESSENGER · Mercury

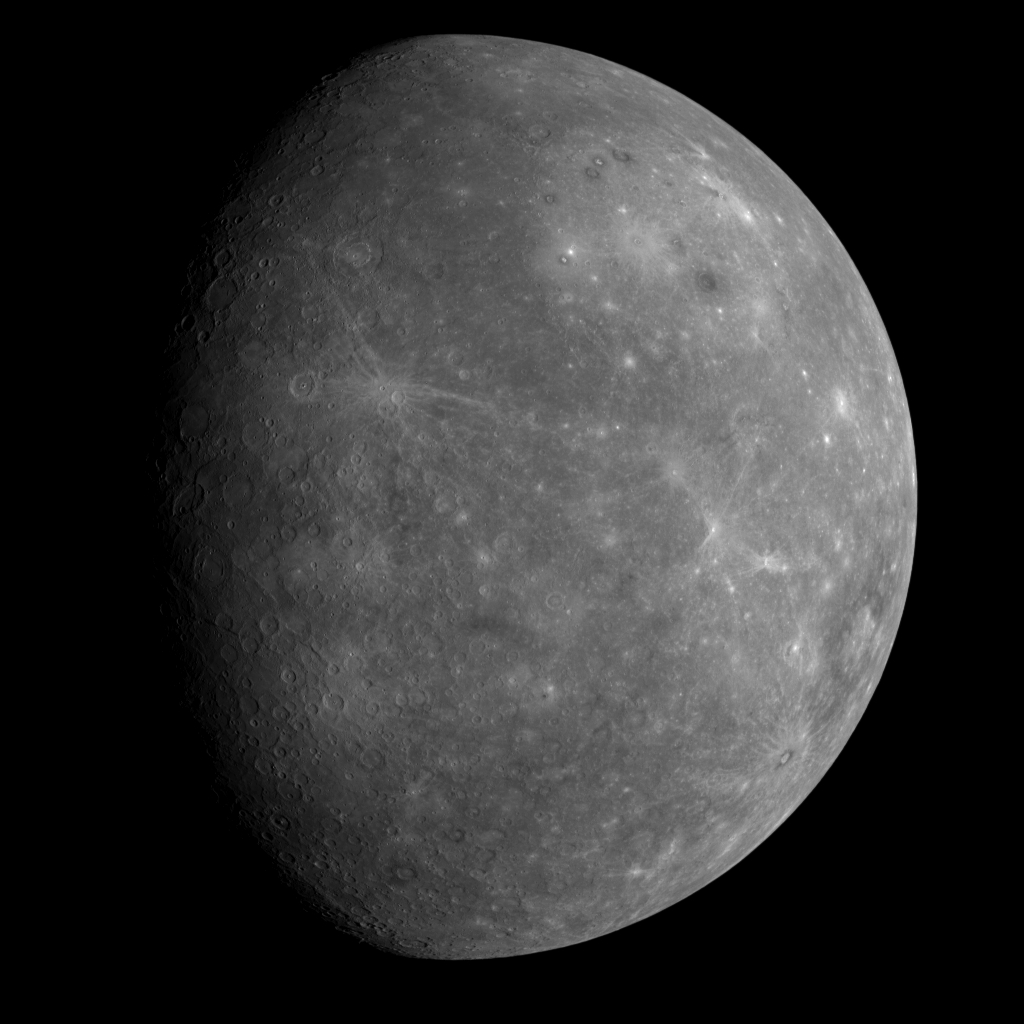
Mercury as seen by MESSENGER during its first flyby, revealing previously unseen surface features

MESSENGER (Mercury Surface, Space Environment, Geochemistry, and Ranging) was a NASA spacecraft and the first to orbit Mercury. Launched from Cape Canaveral on August 3, 2004, it took about six and a half years to reach the planet. To adjust its trajectory and speed, the spacecraft used gravity-assist flybys of Earth, Venus, and Mercury. It flew past Earth in February 2005, Venus in October 2006 and October 2007, and Mercury three times: in January 2008, October 2008, and September 2009. These Mercury flybys provided enough data to image more than 95% of the planet's surface before MESSENGER entered orbit in March 2011.

MESSENGER used a chemical bipropellant propulsion system to reach Mercury and enter orbit. It successfully entered orbit on March 18, 2011. The spacecraft's primary mission ended on March 17, 2012, after it had collected nearly 100,000 images. In November 2012, NASA announced that MESSENGER had found evidence of water ice and organic compounds in permanently shadowed craters near Mercury's north pole. Although the mission had initially been expected to end in 2012 because of limited fuel for orbit maintenance, the spacecraft continued operating. It mapped the entire planet by March 6, 2013, and completed its first year-long extended mission on March 17, 2013. In February 2013, NASA published a detailed three-dimensional map of Mercury assembled from thousands of MESSENGER images. The spacecraft continued collecting scientific data until April 30, 2015, when its orbit had decayed to the point that it crashed into Mercury's surface.

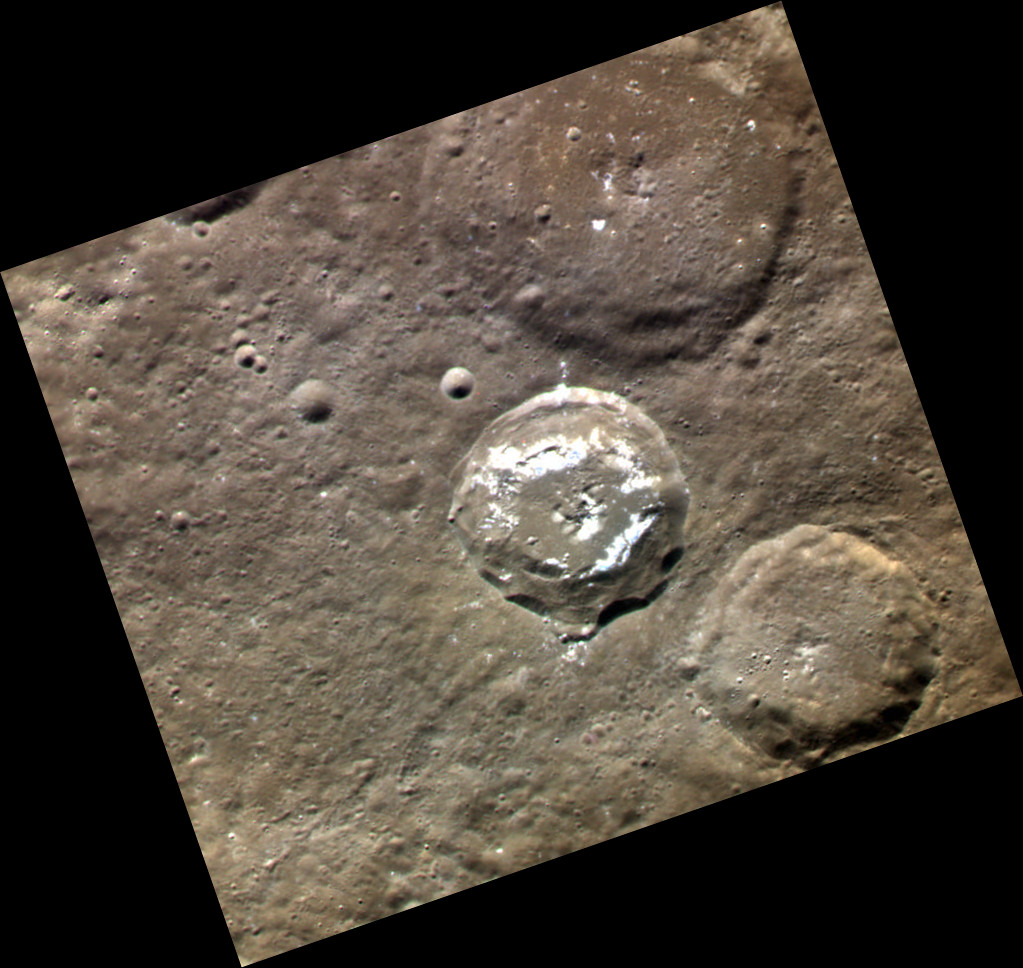
Baranauskas crater on Mercury, with hollows visible as bright patches within the crater. Approximate color image composed of three images acquired by MESSENGER

The MESSENGER mission was designed to study Mercury's physical characteristics and space environment. Its scientific objectives were to:

- characterize the chemical composition of Mercury's surface;
- study the planet's geological history;
- investigate the nature of Mercury's magnetic field and magnetosphere;
- determine the size and state of its core;
- determine the distribution of volatile materials at the poles; and
- study the planet's exosphere.

=== BepiColombo (2026) ===
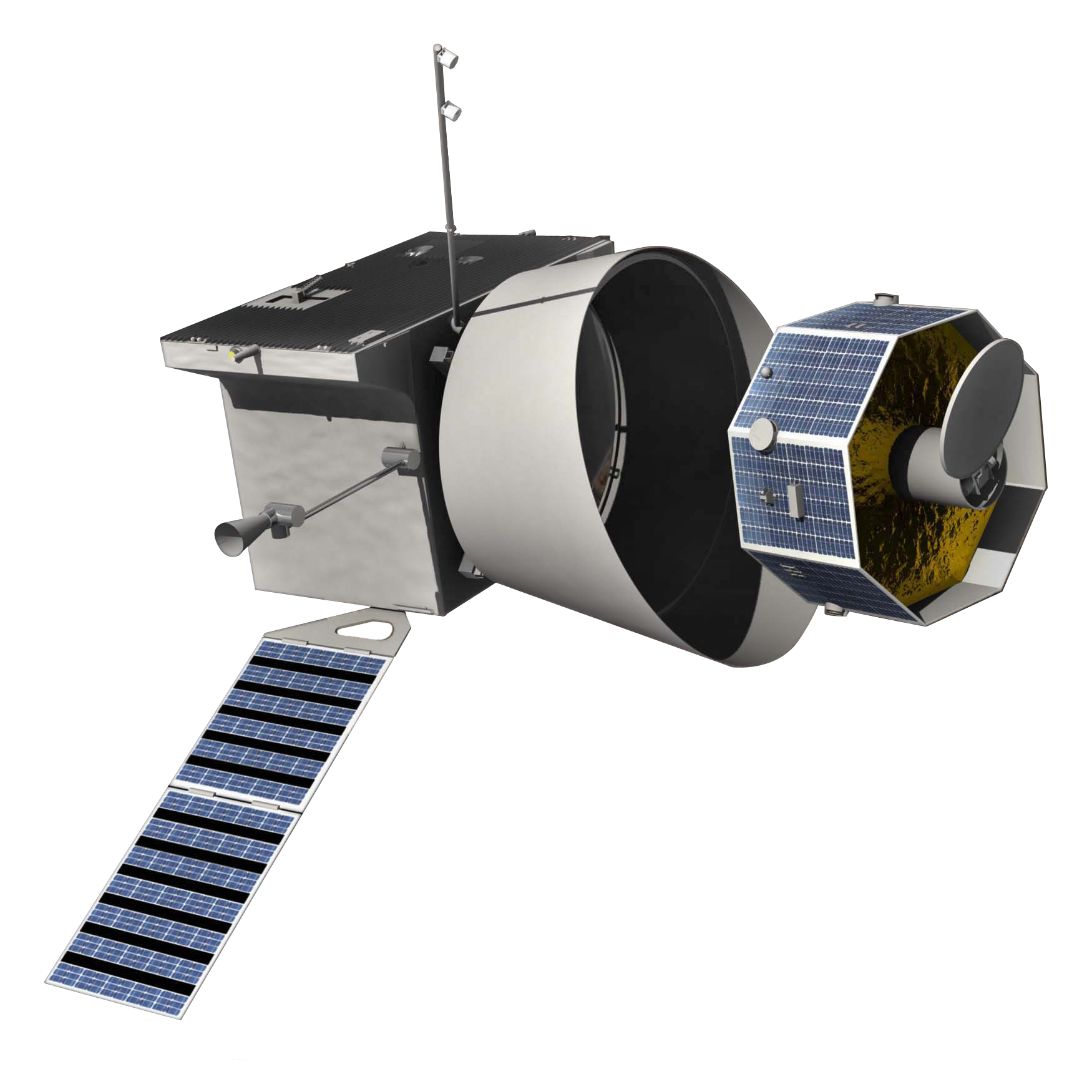
Artist's impression of the BepiColombo mission's two orbiters: the Mercury Planetary Orbiter (left) and the Mercury Magnetospheric Orbiter (right)

BepiColombo is a joint mission of the European Space Agency (ESA) and the Japan Aerospace Exploration Agency (JAXA) to explore Mercury. It consists of two spacecraft: the Mercury Planetary Orbiter (MPO) and Mio, also known as the Mercury Magnetospheric Orbiter (MMO). The MPO is designed to map Mercury's surface and study the composition of its surface and exosphere using observations at multiple wavelengths, while Mio focuses on the planet's magnetosphere. ESA built the MPO, and JAXA built Mio.

BepiColombo was designed to build on the findings of the earlier MESSENGER mission. It carries a broader suite of scientific instruments and uses different orbits to collect additional data on Mercury's surface, exosphere, and magnetosphere.

The mission has several scientific objectives:

- Study the origin and evolution of a planet orbiting close to its parent star.
- Investigate Mercury's shape, interior, structure, geology, composition, and impact craters.
- Study the composition and dynamics of Mercury's exosphere, including the processes by which it forms and escapes.
- Investigate the structure and dynamics of Mercury's magnetosphere.
- Determine the origin of Mercury's magnetic field.
- Test Einstein's theory of general relativity by precisely measuring the parameters γ and β in the parameterized post-Newtonian formalism.

Like Mariner 10 and MESSENGER, BepiColombo uses gravity-assist maneuvers involving Earth, Venus, and Mercury to adjust its trajectory. It also uses solar electric propulsion, powered by ion engines, to help control its speed and trajectory. These techniques reduce the propellant needed to enter orbit around Mercury, a challenging task because the Sun's gravity accelerates the spacecraft toward it.

The BepiColombo mission was approved in November 2009 and launched on October 20, 2018. On its way to Mercury, the spacecraft completed gravity-assist flybys of Earth on April 10, 2020, Venus on October 15, 2020, and Venus again on August 11, 2021, followed by six flybys of Mercury between October 1, 2021, and January 8, 2025. During these encounters, its monitoring cameras and scientific instruments captured close-up images of Mercury for the first time since MESSENGER, including views of the south polar region and permanently shadowed craters in the north.

Measurements of Mercury's magnetic field, plasma environment, and particle populations revealed previously unobserved features, including a low-latitude layer of particles spanning a broad energy range, trapped energetic hydrogen ions, and cold ions of oxygen, sodium, and potassium. The third flyby also detected chirping whistler-mode waves similar to those observed at Earth, while the fifth provided the first mid-infrared observations of Mercury's surface.

BepiColombo was originally scheduled to enter orbit around Mercury in December 2025, but reduced performance of its ion thrusters delayed the planned arrival until December 2026, with routine scientific operation beginning in April 2027. The primary mission is scheduled to continue until April 2028, with a possible extension through April 2029.

== Proposed missions ==
In 1967, NASA published a report examining crewed missions to Mercury and Venus, as well as an uncrewed mission to Mercury. The report considered launch windows, spacecraft speed, travel time to Mercury, and the duration of crewed missions.

Mercury-P (Russian: Меркурий-П) is a proposed Russian mission to land a spacecraft on Mercury. The spacecraft would use solar electric propulsion to reach Mercury orbit before deploying a semi-hard lander based on designs developed for the Mars 96 project.

In August 2020, the Applied Physics Laboratory proposed the Mercury Lander mission for NASA's New Frontiers program. Under the proposal, the spacecraft would launch in March 2035 and land on Mercury in April 2045.

== See also ==
- Exploration of Venus
- Exploration of Mars
- Exploration of Jupiter
- Exploration of Saturn
- Exploration of Uranus
- Exploration of Neptune
