= Inter-crater plains on Mercury =

Plains on Mercury

Inter-crater plains on Mercury are a land-form consisting of plains between craters on Mercury.

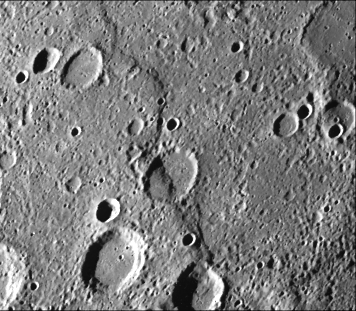
Inter-crater plains and heavily cratered terrain typical of much of Mercury outside the area affected by the formation of the Caloris Basin. Abundant shallow elongate craters and crater chains are present on the plains. This image, taken during the first mission of Mariner 10, shows a large tract of inter-crater plains centered at 3° N, 20° W. The scarp running down the middle of the image, Santa Maria Rupes cuts through both the plains and large craters. The scene is 200 km across; north is the top.

Of the eight planets in the Solar System, Mercury is the smallest and closest to the Sun. The surface of this planet is similar to the Moon in that it shows characteristics of heavy cratering and plains formed through volcanic eruptions on the surface. These features indicate that Mercury has been geologically inactive for billions of years. Knowledge of Mercury's geology was initially quite limited because observations have only been through the Mariner 10 flyby in 1975 and observations from Earth. The MESSENGER (an acronym of MErcury Surface, Space ENvironment, GEochemistry, and Ranging) mission of 2004 was a robotic NASA spacecraft orbiting the planet, the first spacecraft ever to do so. The data provided by MESSENGER has revealed a geologically complex planet.

== Types of plains ==
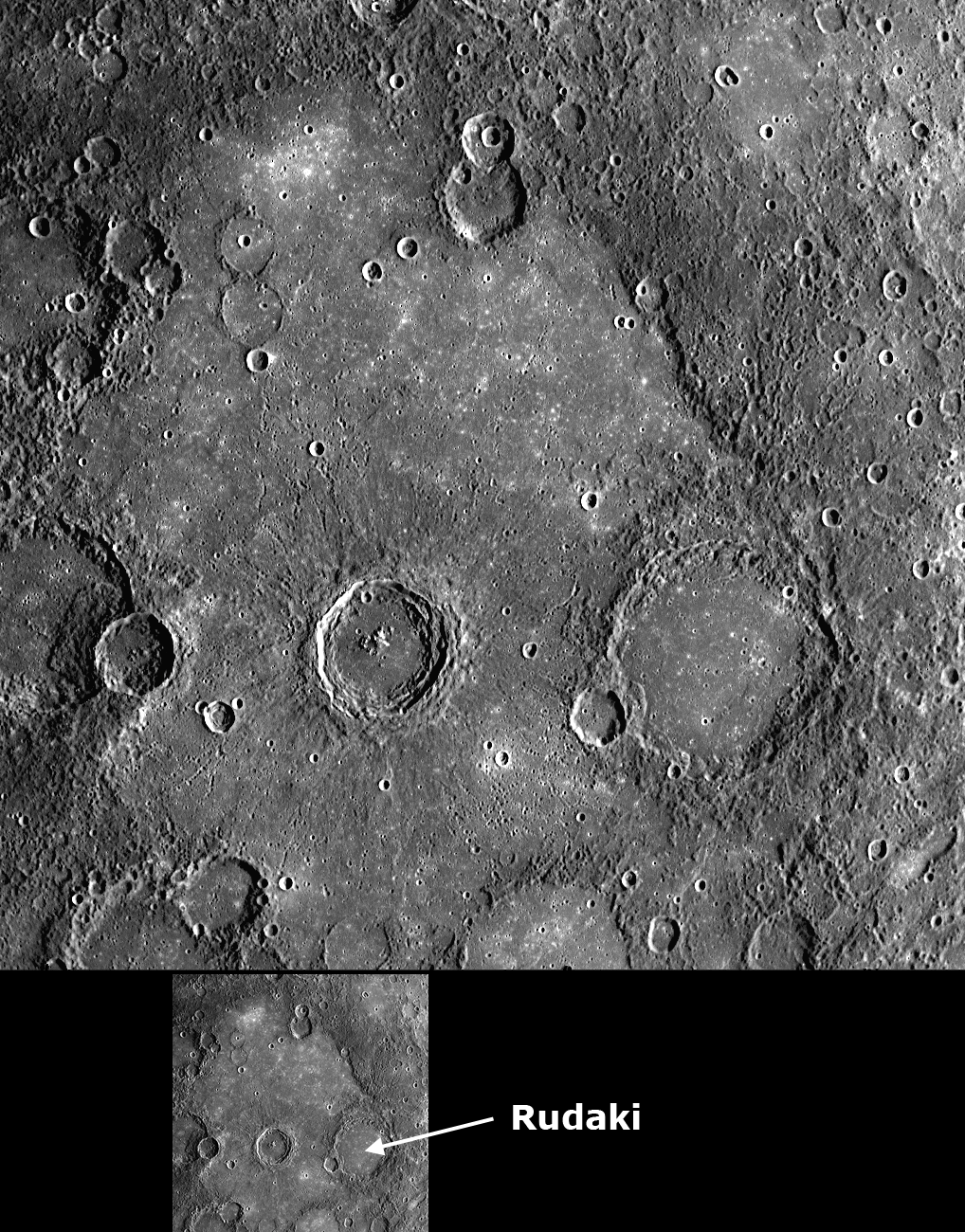
Close up view of the Mercury crater named Rudaki. Image taken from the MESSENGER mission. On the floor of Rudaki and the region surrounding the crater to the west, or left, are areas flooded with lava, leaving only the rims of these craters. This terrain is known as smooth plains, formed by volcanic flows on the surface of Mercury. To the east, or right, of this crater are the inter-crater plains which can be present at many different elevations due to previous uplift after formation.

There are two geologically distinct types of plains on Mercury - smooth plains of volcanic origin, and, inter-crater plains, of uncertain origin.

=== Smooth plains ===
Smooth plains are widespread flat areas resembling the lunar maria of the Moon, which fill depressions of various sizes. A prime example of a smooth plain is the one in which fills a wide ring surrounding the Caloris Basin, the largest impact basin on Mercury. However, a noticeable difference between the lunar maria of the Moon and the smooth plains of Mercury is that these smooth plains have the same albedo, or properties, as the bordering inter-crater plains. Even with a lack of volcanic features, it is still believed that smooth plains are of volcanic origin.

=== Inter-crater plains ===
Inter-crater plains are the oldest visible surface on Mercury, predating the heavily cratered terrain. They are gently rolling or hilly plains and occur in the regions between larger craters. The inter-crater plains appear to have covered up or destroyed many earlier craters, and show a general scarcity of smaller craters below about 30 km in diameter. It is not clear whether they are of volcanic or impact origin. The inter-crater plains are distributed roughly uniformly over the entire surface of the planet.

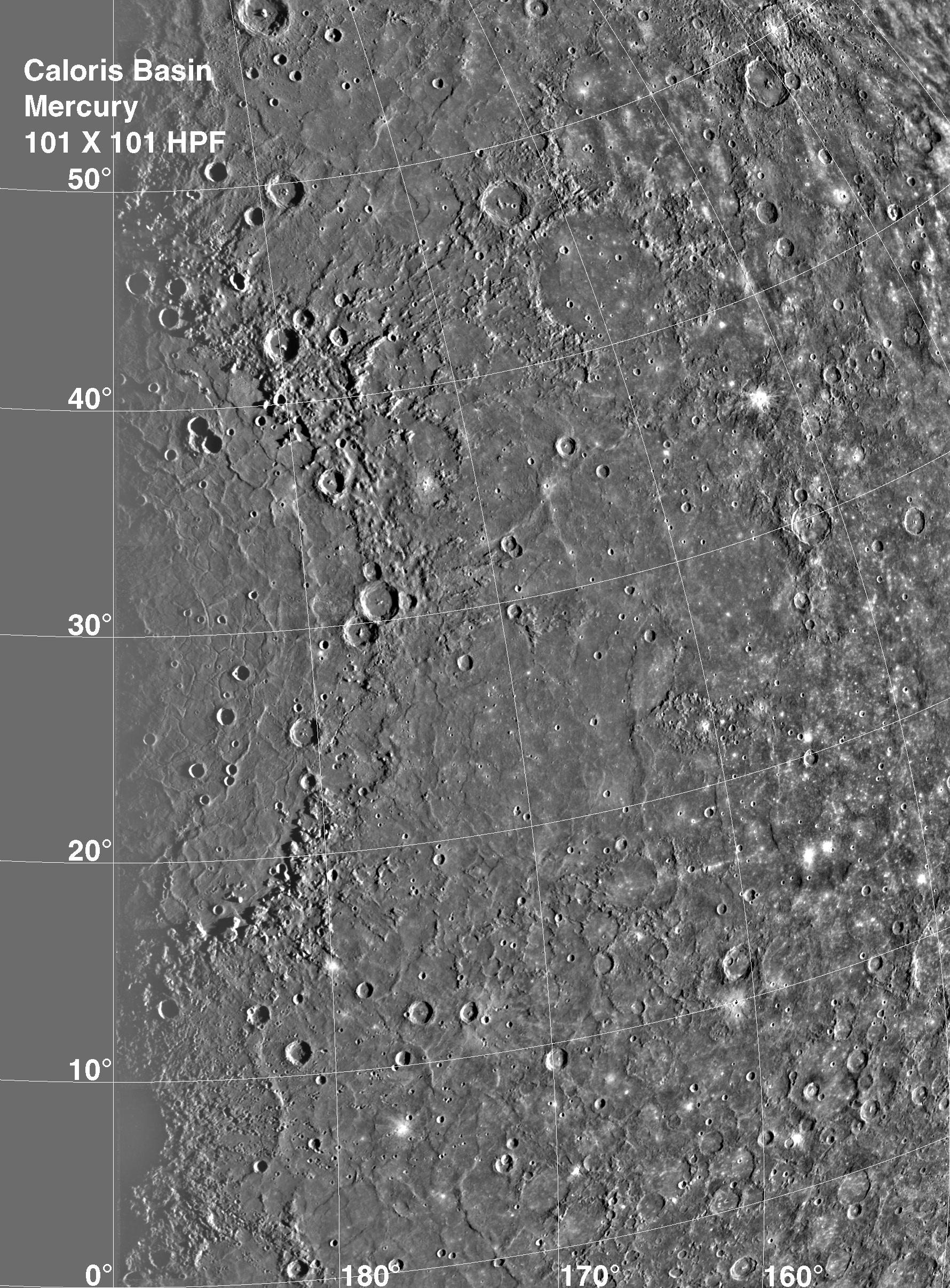
Caloris Basin—Mercury's largest impact crater (left side of image), is surrounded by a ring of mountains with chaotic terrain following this and eventually leading to smooth and inter-crater plains.

The most heavily cratered regions on Mercury contain large areas essentially free of impact craters with diameters greater than 50 kilometers. The surface areas of these regions can basically be divided into two categories: clusters of large craters and plains bordering these clusters of craters. This combination of surface features has been called "inter-crater plains" by the Mariner 10 Imaging Science Team. These plains have sparked debate.

== Origin hypotheses ==
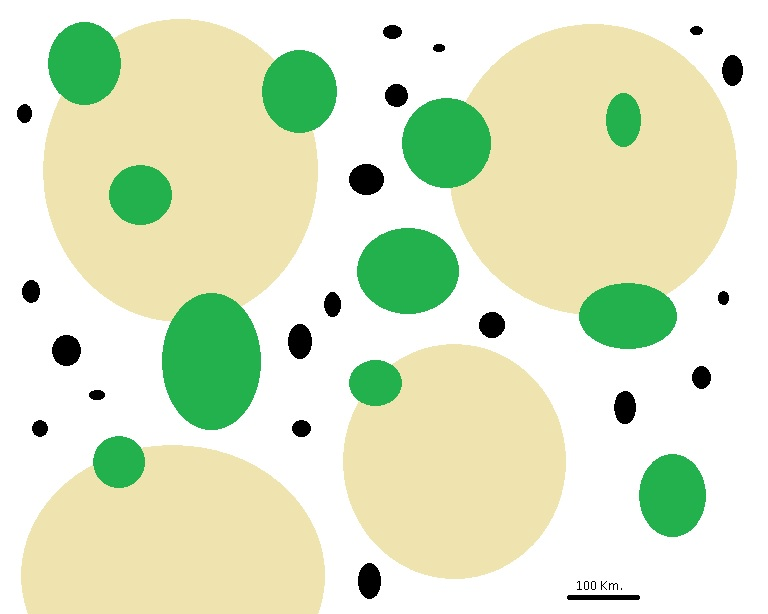
An example of inter-crater plains on Mercury. Yellow shows the inter-crater plains, whereas green shows younger impact craters. White is the surrounding areas of these features. Black is other craters of the area.

Unlike smooth plains, the origin of inter-crater plains has yet to be well determined. Research and studies have narrowed the origin of inter-crater plains on Mercury down to two hypotheses. The first hypotheses attributes formation from fluidized impact, ejecta, which is the result of a meteorite impacting the surface so hard that it turns to liquid, then liquid debris is ejected into the air and lands, filling in any lower elevation areas or craters. The other hypothesis is that the plains formed from volcanic deposits originating from below the surface of Mercury itself.

On the basis of the distribution of inter-crater plains and stratigraphic relationships between secondary craters and smooth plains it is argued that the majority of the inter-crater plains were emplaced volcanically.

== MESSENGER data ==
Information and data were gathered from Mariner 10 stereoscopic images and higher resolution MESSENGER datasets. The higher resolution of the MESSENGER datasets compared with those of Mariner 10 enables the most ancient plains units on Mercury to be better characterized. The inter-crater plains units are densely cratered at diameters under ten km, producing a highly textured surface that yields ancient pre-Tolstojan and Tolstojan ages over 3.9 Ga (billion years). There is no clear correlation with topography; inter-crater plains cover high-standing plateaus and continue into topographic depressions. These results show that either the formation process must have been able to take place over a range of several kilometers supporting an impact-related origin, or that plains are generally flat lying areas which become uplifted, lowered, or tilted after formation.
