= Baranovsky =

Baranovsky, feminine: Baranovskaya is a Russian and Ukrainian variant of the Polish surname Baranowski. Belarusian variant: Baranouski, Ukrainian: Baranovskyi/Baranovska.

- Anatoliy Baranovsky
- Aleksey Baranovsky
- Gavriil Baranovsky, Russian architect
- Irina Baranovskaya
- Khrystofor Baranovsky
- Mikhail Baranovsky
- Mikhail Tugan-Baranovsky
- Natalya Baranovskaya
- Pyotr Baranovsky
- Sergey Baranovsky
- Tatiana Baranovskaya (born 1987), Russian acrobatic gymnast
- Vera Baranovskaya
- Yuliya Baranovskaya (born 1980), Russian TV and radio presenter
