= Mercury-P =

Proposed Russian robotic mission to Mercury

- Artist's rendering of the Mercury-P spacecraft with Dvina-TM solar-electric transport module
- Mission type: Mercury exploration
- Operator: Roscosmos

Spacecraft properties
- BOL mass: 8,120 kg (17,900 lb)
- Landing mass: 710 kg (1,570 lb)
- Payload mass: Lander: 40 kg (88 lb); Orbiter: 50 kg (110 lb)

Start of mission
- Launch date: NET 2030s
- Rocket: Soyuz-2

Mercury orbiter

Mercury lander

Mercury-P (Russian: Меркурий-П) is a likely abandoned mission concept for an orbiter and lander by Roscosmos to study the planet Mercury. The letter P in Mercury-P stands for the Russian word 'posadka', meaning landing.

== History ==
Mercury-P would be the first soft lander on Mercury. A proposed flight scenario for the mission included a flyby of Venus, the insertion of the spacecraft into the orbit around Mercury (possibly by use of a Dvina solar-electric tug), and the delivery of a lander on its surface. The Institute of Space Research studied the possibility of "recycling" hardware developed for the Phobos-Grunt, Mars-NET, Mars-96, and Solar Sail spacecraft, with proposed upgrades of the hardware. As of 2012, Russian scientists have conducted a preliminary concept study of the project, and compiled a list of the required scientific payload.

As a result of the failure of the Phobos-Grunt, several Russian planetary exploration proposals derived from its design were delayed into the 2030s, including Mercury-P. The project hasn't figured in Russian spaceflight plans since 2012.

== See also ==
- Exploration of Mercury
- Mariner 10
- MESSENGER
- BepiColombo
