= Pre-Tolstojan =

Oldest period of the history of Mercury

Etymology
- Alternate spelling(s): Pretolstojan

Usage information
- Celestial body: Mercury
- Time scale(s) used: Mercurian Geologic Timescale

Definition
- Chronological unit: Period
- Stratigraphic unit: System

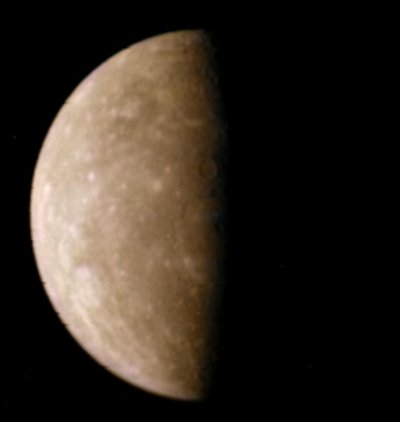
View of Mercury (planet) from Mariner 10

Pre-Tolstojan, also Pretolstojan Period, refers to the oldest period of the history of Mercury, c. 4500–3900 million years ago. It is the first period in Mercury's geologic history, and refers to its formation and the 600 million or so years in its aftermath. Mercury was formed with a tiny crust, mantle, and a giant core and as it evolved it faced heavy bombardments that created most of the craters and intercrater plains seen on the planet's surface today. Many of the smaller basins and multi-ring basins were created during this period. Considered a "dead" planet, its geology is highly diverse with craters forming the dominant terrain.

The name Pre-Tolstojan refers to the time before the formation of the Tolstoj crater on the surface of Mercury, which is believed to have been formed by an impact c. 3900 million years ago. The latter has been named after the Russian writer Leo Tolstoy.

== History ==
The history of Mercury is divided into five periods; Pre-Tolstojan is the first epoch, the other four are Tolstojan, Calorian, Mansurian, and Kuiperian. Pre-Tolstojan stage I represents the formation stage of Mercury when it evolved as a tiny crust, mantle, and a giant core. During this period, multi-ring basins were created due to bombardment and concurrently formation of craters and intercrater plains also occurred. The location of Lobate scarps and their relative age, overlaid on a geometric map of Mercury using Mariner 10 mosaics indicate that these formations occurred in pre-Tolstojan intercrater plains, and later during the Tolstojan and Calorian periods.

=== Geology ===
Based on surface geology and albedo the sequence of creation of Mercury has been recorded and compared with that of the formation epochs of the Moon which show some similarities. The mapped region of Mercury shows intercrater plains, basins, smooth plains, craters and tectonic features. The earliest formation recorded is that of multi-ring basins (less than 500 kilometres (310 mi) diameter) during the Pre-Tolstojan epoch; the morphologic features indicate domination of a single ring formation. The intercrater plains lie between and amidst large craters. Lobate scarps, seen extensively on planet Mercury, are in the form of undulating to arcuate scarps; wrinkle ridges are observed in the smooth plains materials. The basins of less than 500 kilometres (310 mi) diameter are presumed to have disappeared during the bombardment. The formations, in the order of their earliest occurrence, are (with Lunar counterparts indicated within brackets): Pre-Tolstojan period with formations of inter-crater plains, multi-ring basins and crater materials (pre-Nectarian more than 4.5 billion years ago); Tolstojan period with Goya formations (Tolstoj Basin deposits), Plains, small Basin Plains and Crater materials (Nectarian, 4.2 to 3.8 billion years ago); Calorian period of Caloris group (including secondaries and ridges), Caloris structured plains, Caloris smooth plains, Crater and small basin material (Imbrian, 3.87 to 3.75 billion years ago), Mansurian with slightly degraded crater materials (Eratospheries, 3.24 to 3.11 billion years ago); and Kuiperian of bright rayed craters (Kuiper is an example), and crater materials (Copernican, 2.2 to 1.25 billion years ago).
