= Leonid Baranovskyi =

Ukrainian footballer

Personal information
- Full name: Leonid Andriyovych Baranovskyi
- Date of birth: 15 July 1953
- Place of birth: Odesa, Ukrainian SSR, Soviet Union
- Date of death: 8 December 2013 (aged 60)
- Place of death: Odesa, Ukraine
- Height: 1.73 m (5 ft 8 in)
- Position: Midfielder

Youth career
- Lokomotiv Odesa
- 1971: Chornomorets Odesa

Senior career*
Years	Team	Apps	(Gls)
1972–1975	Chornomorets Odesa	20	(2)
1975–1978	SKA Odesa	54	(4)
- * Club domestic league appearances and goals

Leonid Andriyovych Baranovskyi (Ukrainian: Леонід Андрійович Барановський; 15 July 1953 – 8 December 2013) was a Ukrainian footballer who primarily played as a midfielder.

Leonid Baranovskyi died following a long illness on 8 December 2013, aged 60, in Odesa, Ukraine.
