= Edward Baranoski =

American electrical engineer

Edward Baranoski, from Intelligence Advanced Research Projects Activity (IARPA), McLean, VA, was named Fellow of the Institute of Electrical and Electronics Engineers (IEEE) in 2016 for leadership in knowledge-aided radar systems for indoor environments.
