= Baranauskas (crater) =

Crater on Mercury

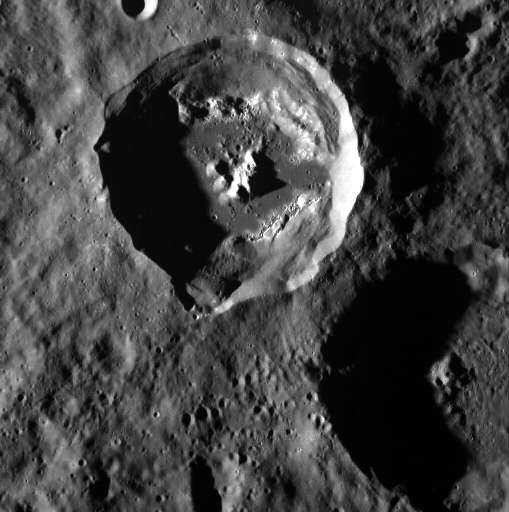
- MESSENGER WAC image of Baranauskas
- Feature type: Central-peak impact crater
- Location: Victoria quadrangle, Mercury
- Coordinates: 50.73°N 39.76°W
- Diameter: 36 km (22 mi)
- Eponym: Antanas Baranauskas

Baranauskas is a crater on Mercury. It has a diameter of 36 kilometres (22 miles). Its name was adopted by the International Astronomical Union (IAU) on September 25, 2015. Baranauskas is named for the Lithuanian poet Antanas Baranauskas.

The floor and walls of the crater have hollows, which appear bright when the sun is high in the sky.

== Views ==
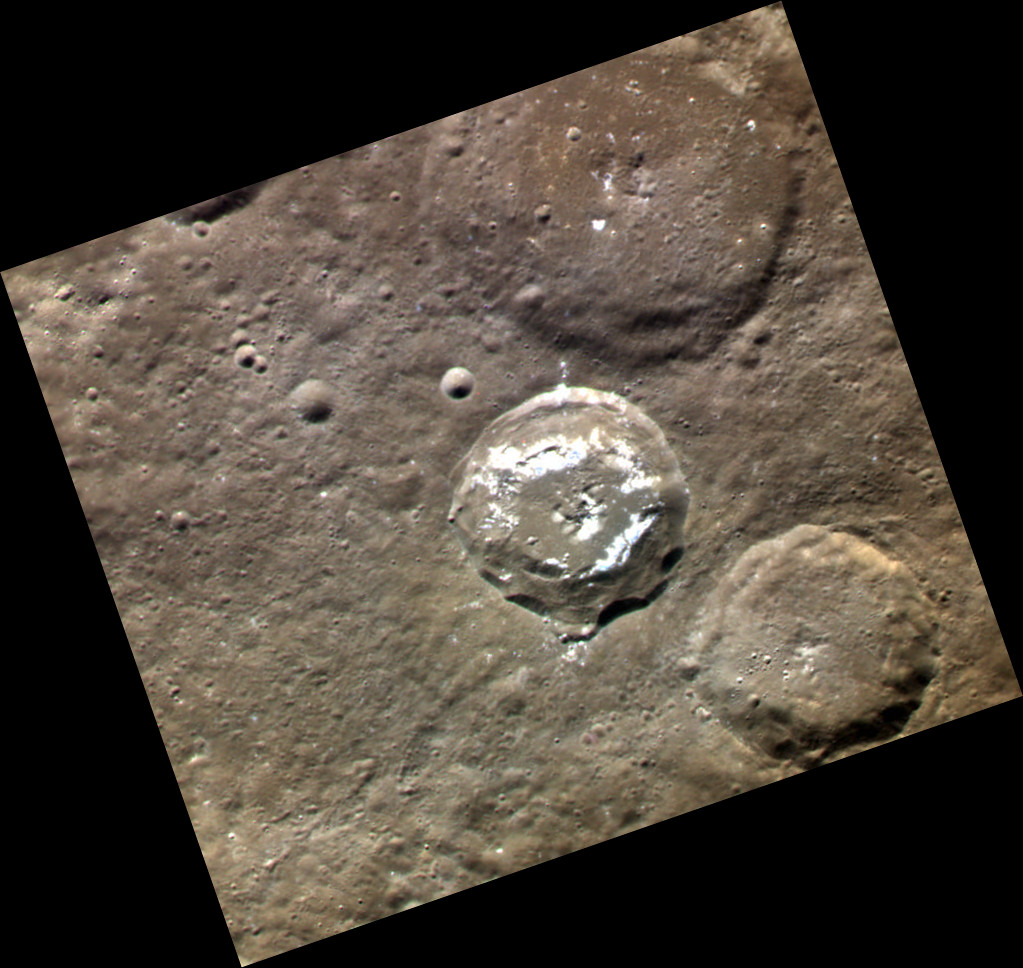
Approximate color image

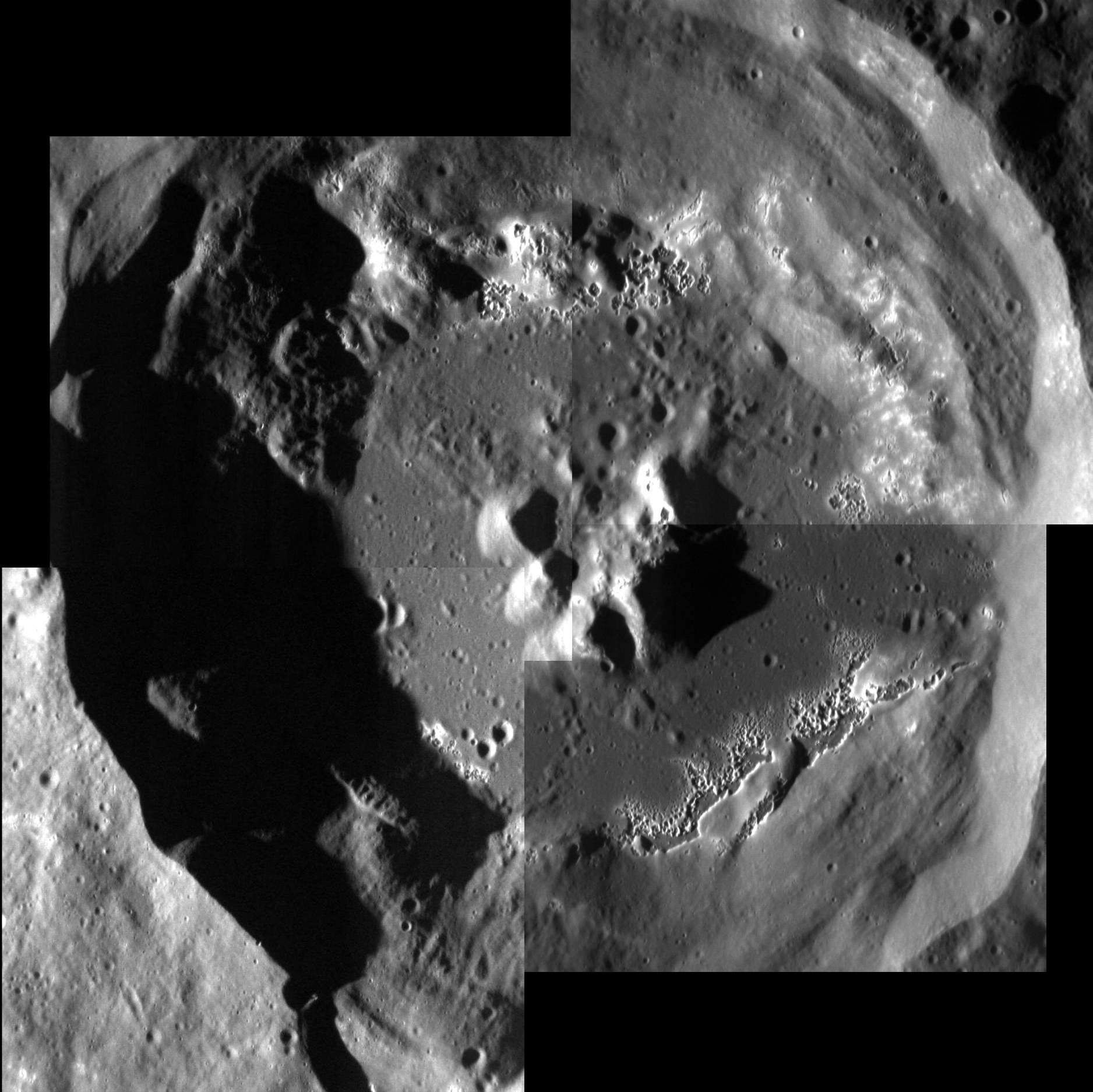
High-resolution mosaic showing details of hollows
