= Anna Barańska (climber) =

Polish mountaineer

Anna Barańska is a Polish mountaineer, and climber of three eight-thousanders. She became the first Polish woman to summit Mount Everest from the North side on 21 May 2009. She was born and resides in Warsaw. She obtained her two master's degrees from the Warsaw School of Economics and works in finance and investments. She is not a member of any mountaineering organization. She began climbing in 2000 with the ascent of Rysy from the Slovak side. Her subsequent climbs include: Gerlach (2650 m) – June 2000; Triglav (2864 m) – September 2001; Mont Blanc (4810 m) – August 2002; Elbrus (5642 m) – unsuccessful summit attempt in August 2003; Lenin Peak (7210 m) via the normal route – June 2004.

== Eight-thousanders ==
On 28 September 2005 Anna reached the summit of Cho Oyu (8201 m) in Tibet via the normal route together with Piotr Barabas. She climbed without supplementary oxygen and without Sherpa support.

In 2009, she participated in an international expedition to the north side of Mount Everest and became the first Polish woman to reach the summit from the north/Tibetan side on 21 May. The expedition was marked by two fatalities: one climber died of a heart attack at Camp I and another perished after summiting, remaining below the Third Step.

On 21 July 2013, she successfully climbed Gasherbrum II (8035 m) as a member of an international expedition.
