= Atmosphere of Mercury =

Gas layer surrounding planet Mercury

- Mercury's surface, with the atmosphere too thin to be visible.

General information
- Chemical species: Column density cm^{−2}; Surface density cm^{−3}

Composition
- Hydrogen: ~ 3 × 10^{9}; ~ 250
- Molecular hydrogen: < 3 × 10^{15}; < 1.4 × 10^{7}
- Helium: < 3 × 10^{11}; ~ 6 × 10^{3}
- Oxygen: < 3 × 10^{11}; ~ 4 × 10^{4}
- Molecular oxygen: < 9 × 10^{14}; < 2.5 × 10^{7}
- Sodium: ~ 2 × 10^{11}; 1.7–3.8 × 10^{4}
- Potassium: ~ 2 × 10^{9}; ~ 4000
- Calcium: ~ 1.1 × 10^{8}; ~ 3000
- Magnesium: ~ 4 × 10^{10}; ~ 7.5 × 10^{3}
- Argon: ~ 1.3 × 10^{9}; < 6.6 × 10^{6}
- Water: < 1 × 10^{12}; < 1.5 × 10^{7}

Mercury, the closest planet to the Sun, has the weakest magnetic field and the smallest mass of the four terrestrial planets. It has an extremely tenuous and variable exosphere containing hydrogen, helium, oxygen, sodium, calcium, potassium, and water vapor, with a combined pressure of about 10^{−14} bar (1 nPa). The exosphere is replenished by particles from the solar wind and material released from Mercury's surface. Solar radiation pushes some of these particles away from the Sun, producing a comet-like tail behind the planet.

The existence of an atmosphere on Mercury remained controversial until the 1970s, although by then a consensus had emerged that the planet, like the Moon, lacked a substantial atmosphere. This view was confirmed in 1974 when the Mariner 10 spacecraft detected only a tenuous exosphere. In 2009, the MESSENGER spacecraft obtained more detailed measurements and detected magnesium in Mercury's exosphere.

== Composition ==
Mercury's exosphere consists of several species originating from either the solar wind or the planet's surface. The first constituents detected were atomic hydrogen (H), helium (He) and atomic oxygen (O), observed by the ultraviolet radiation photometer on the Mariner 10 spacecraft in 1974. Near-surface concentrations were estimated to range from 230 cm^{−3} for hydrogen to 44,000 cm^{−3} for oxygen, with helium at an intermediate concentration. In 2008, the MESSENGER spacecraft confirmed the presence of atomic hydrogen, although its concentration appeared to be higher than the 1974 estimate. Mercury's exospheric hydrogen and helium are believed to originate primarily from the solar wind, while the oxygen is likely released from the planet's surface.

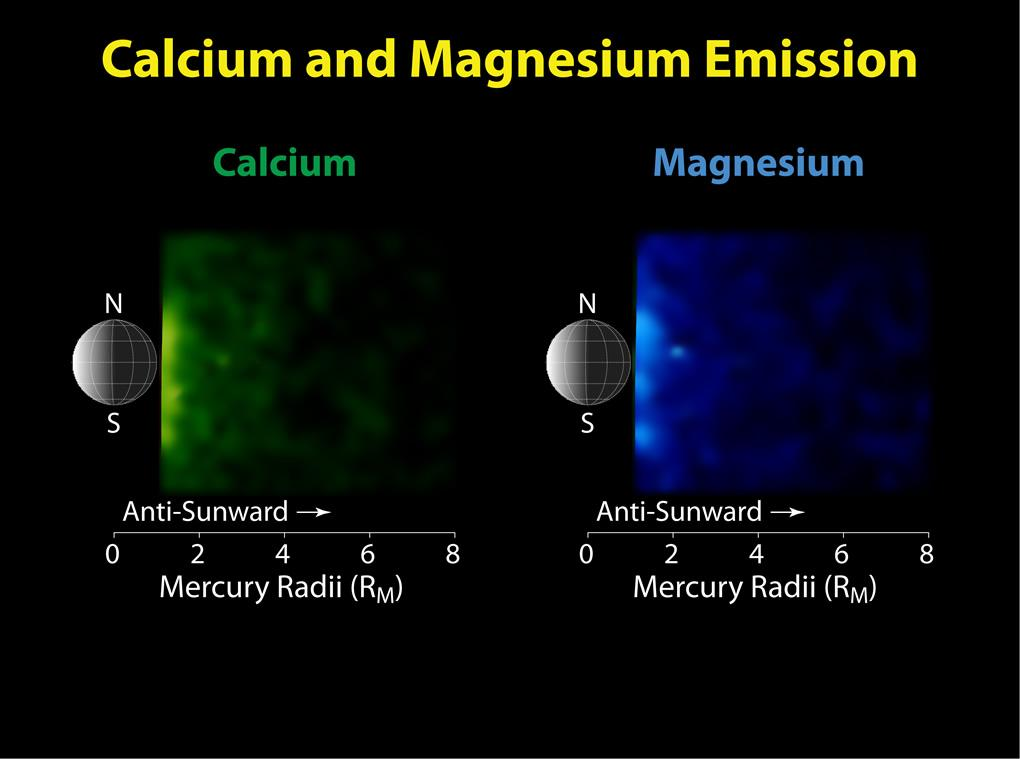
Mercury's calcium and magnesium tail during MESSENGER's third flyby on September 29, 2009

Sodium (Na) was the fourth species detected in Mercury's exosphere. It was discovered in 1985 by Drew Potter and Tom Morgan, who observed its Fraunhofer emission lines at 589 and 589.6 nm. Sodium has an average column density of about 1 × 10^{11} cm^{−2} and is concentrated near Mercury's poles, where it forms bright spots. Its abundance is also greater near the dawn terminator than near the dusk terminator. Some studies have reported a correlation between sodium abundance and surface features such as the Caloris basin and radio-bright regions, although these findings remain controversial. In 1986, Potter and Morgan reported the detection of potassium (K), whose column density is about two orders of magnitude lower than that of sodium. The two elements otherwise have similar properties and spatial distributions. Calcium (Ca) was detected in 1998, with a column density about three orders of magnitude lower than that of sodium. Observations by MESSENGER in 2009 showed that calcium is concentrated mainly near Mercury's equator, in contrast to the distributions of sodium and potassium. Further observations reported in 2014 indicated that meteoroid impacts, including those associated with meteor showers from Comet Encke, contribute material to Mercury's exosphere by vaporizing the surface.

In 2008, the MESSENGER spacecraft's Fast Imaging Plasma Spectrometer (FIPS) detected several molecular ions near Mercury, including H_{2}O^{+} (ionized water vapor) and H_{2}S^{+} (ionized hydrogen sulfide). Their abundances relative to sodium were approximately 0.2 and 0.7, respectively. Other detected ions include H_{3}O^{+} (hydronium), OH (hydroxyl), O_{2}^{+} and Si^{+}. During its 2009 flyby, the Ultraviolet and Visible Spectrometer (UVVS) aboard MESSENGER's Mercury Atmospheric and Surface Composition Spectrometer (MASCS) detected magnesium in Mercury's exosphere for the first time. Its near-surface abundance was roughly comparable to that of sodium.

== Properties ==
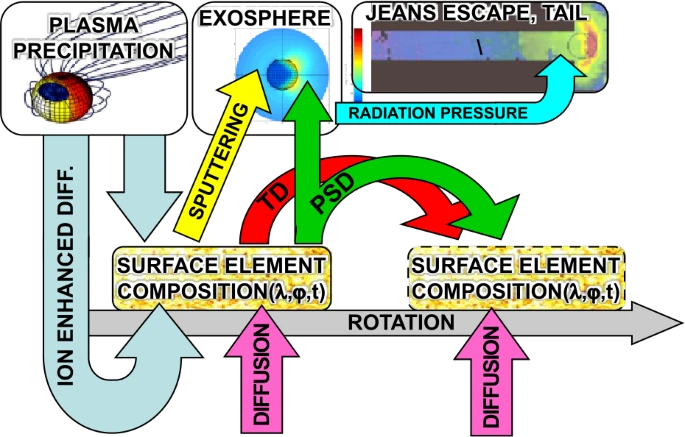
Scheme of sodium circulation between Mercury's surface and exosphere

Ultraviolet observations by Mariner 10 established an upper limit for the exospheric surface density of about 10^{5} particles per cubic centimeter, corresponding to a surface pressure of less than 10^{−12} bar (1 nPa).

The temperature of Mercury's exosphere varies by species and geographic location. The temperature of atomic hydrogen is about 420 K, based on measurements by both Mariner 10 and MESSENGER. Sodium is considerably hotter, with temperatures ranging from 750 to 1,500 K near the equator and from 1,500 to 3,500 K near the poles. Some observations indicate that Mercury is surrounded by a hot corona of calcium atoms with temperatures ranging from 12,000 to 20,000 K.

In the early 2000s, researchers modeled Mercury's sodium exosphere and its temporal variations to identify the processes that supply material from the planet's surface. The models considered evaporation, diffusion from the interior, sputtering by photons and energetic ions, photon-stimulated chemical sputtering, and meteoroid vaporization. Evaporation provided the best match for the observed variations in Mercury's sodium exosphere with solar distance and local time, based on observations of the sodium tail in 2001.

=== Tails ===
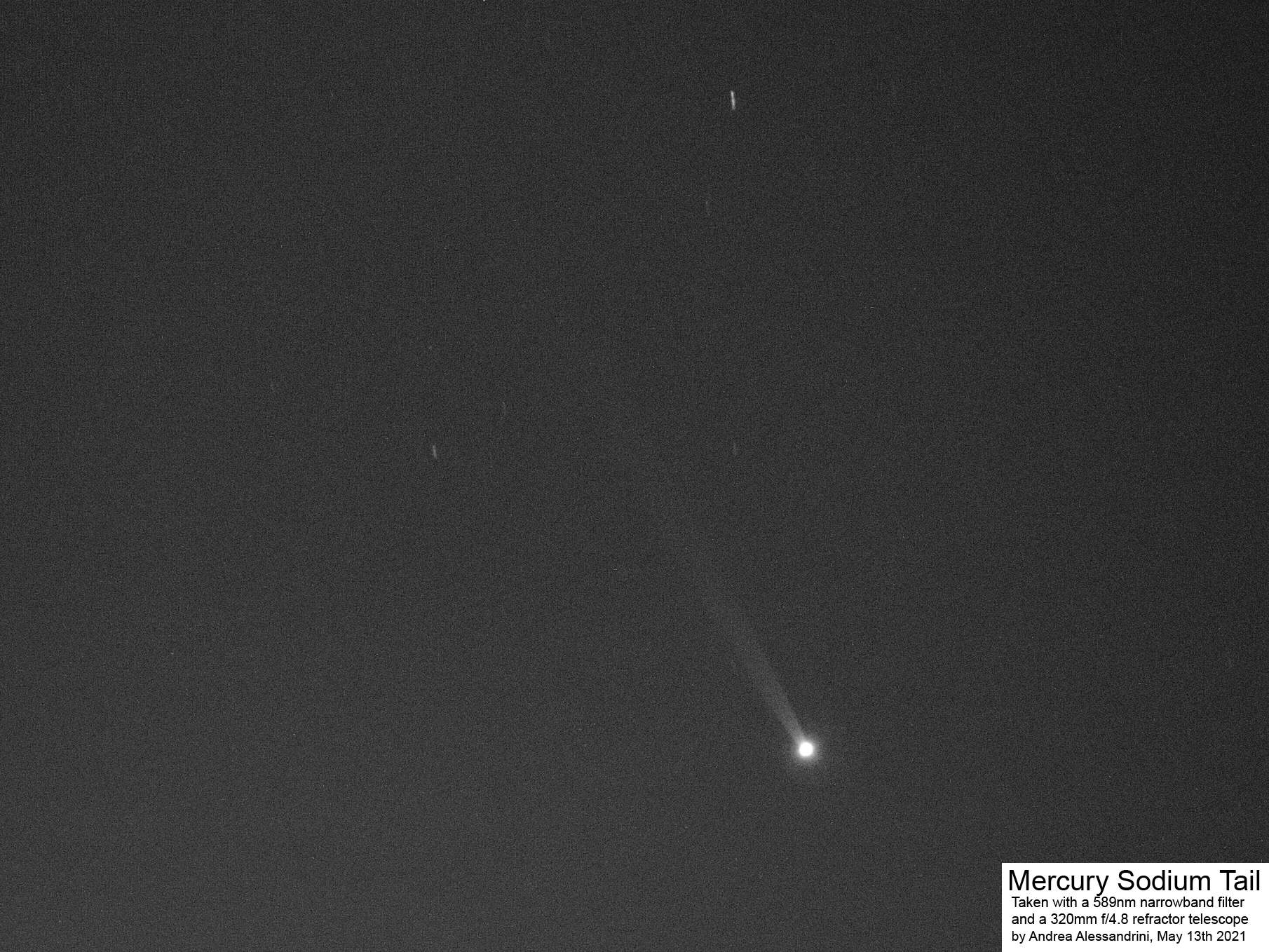
Narrowband image of Mercury's sodium tail captured during maximum eastern elongation on May 13, 2021

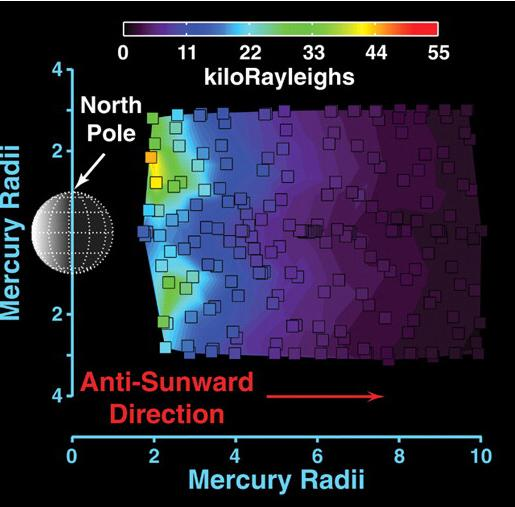
Mercury's sodium tail during MESSENGER's first flyby on January 14, 2008

Because of Mercury's proximity to the Sun, solar radiation pressure is much stronger there than near Earth. This pressure pushes neutral atoms away from Mercury, producing a comet-like tail behind the planet. Sodium is the tail's primary component and has been detected more than 24 million km (1000 R_{M}) from the planet. The sodium tail expands rapidly, reaching a diameter of about 20,000 km at a distance of 17,500 km from Mercury. In 2009, MESSENGER also detected calcium and magnesium in the tail, although these elements were observed only within 8 R_{M} of the planet.

== Observation difficulties ==
Mercury is the least explored of the inner planets because of the challenges involved in observing and reaching it. As seen from Earth, Mercury always appears close to the Sun, making observations difficult. The Hubble Space Telescope and other space-based observatories have highly sensitive instruments that can observe faint and distant objects, but they cannot be pointed directly at the Sun because its intense radiation could damage their sensors.

Spacecraft missions that fly past or orbit Mercury can provide detailed observations of the planet. Although Mercury is closer to Earth than Pluto, reaching it from Earth requires a significant amount of energy. As a spacecraft approaches the Sun, it accelerates under the Sun's gravity, requiring it to perform additional maneuvers to reduce its velocity and enter an orbit around Mercury. These maneuvers consume propellant that could otherwise be replaced by additional scientific instruments or other spacecraft hardware.

== See also ==
- Orders of magnitude (pressure)
- Magnetosphere of Mercury
