= (884793) 2017 VR12 =

Small near-Earth asteroid

(884793) 2017 VR_{12}
- Goldstone/Green Bank Telescope radar images of 2017 VR_{12}

Discovery
- Discovered by: Pan-STARRS 1
- Discovery site: Haleakala Obs.
- Discovery date: 10 November 2017 (first observed only)

Designations
- Minor planet category: NEO · PHA; Apollo · Amor (Note: It is either an Amor or an Apollo asteroid, depending on the definition of those orbital classes: JPL SBDB defines Apollo asteroids as those with a perihelion of less than 1.017 AU (smaller than Earth's aphelion), while the MPC uses a threshold of 1.000 AU (Earth's semi-major axis). 2017 VR_{12}'s perihelion is 1.0004 AU.)

Orbital characteristics
- Epoch 23 March 2018 (JD 2458200.5)
- Uncertainty parameter 3
- Observation arc: 118 days
- Aphelion: 1.7389 AU
- Perihelion: 1.0004 AU
- Semi-major axis: 1.3697 AU
- Eccentricity: 0.2696
- Orbital period (sidereal): 1.60 yr (585.50 d)
- Mean anomaly: 8.8927°
- Mean motion: 0° 36^{m} 53.64^{s} / day
- Inclination: 9.2247°
- Longitude of ascending node: 347.32°
- Argument of perihelion: 180.74°
- Earth MOID: 0.0077 AU (3.0 LD)

Physical characteristics
- Dimensions: 160 m × 100 m
- Mean diameter: 160 m
- Synodic rotation period: 1.4 h 1.5 h
- Spectral type: V
- Absolute magnitude (H): 20.6

(884793) 2017 VR_{12} is a sub-kilometer asteroid with a somewhat elongated and angular shape, approximately 160 meters (500 feet) in diameter. It is classified as a near-Earth object and potentially hazardous asteroid of the Apollo or Amor group. The V-type asteroid has a rotation period of approximately 1.5 hours. It was first observed on 10 November 2017 by the 60-inch Pan-STARRS 1 telescope at Haleakala Observatory in Hawaii.

== Orbit and classification ==
It orbits the Sun at a distance of 1.0–1.7 AU once every 1 years and 7 months (585 days; semi-major axis of 1.37 AU). Its orbit has an eccentricity of 0.27 and an inclination of 9° with respect to the ecliptic. 2017 VR_{12} is a V-type asteroid with a bright surface.

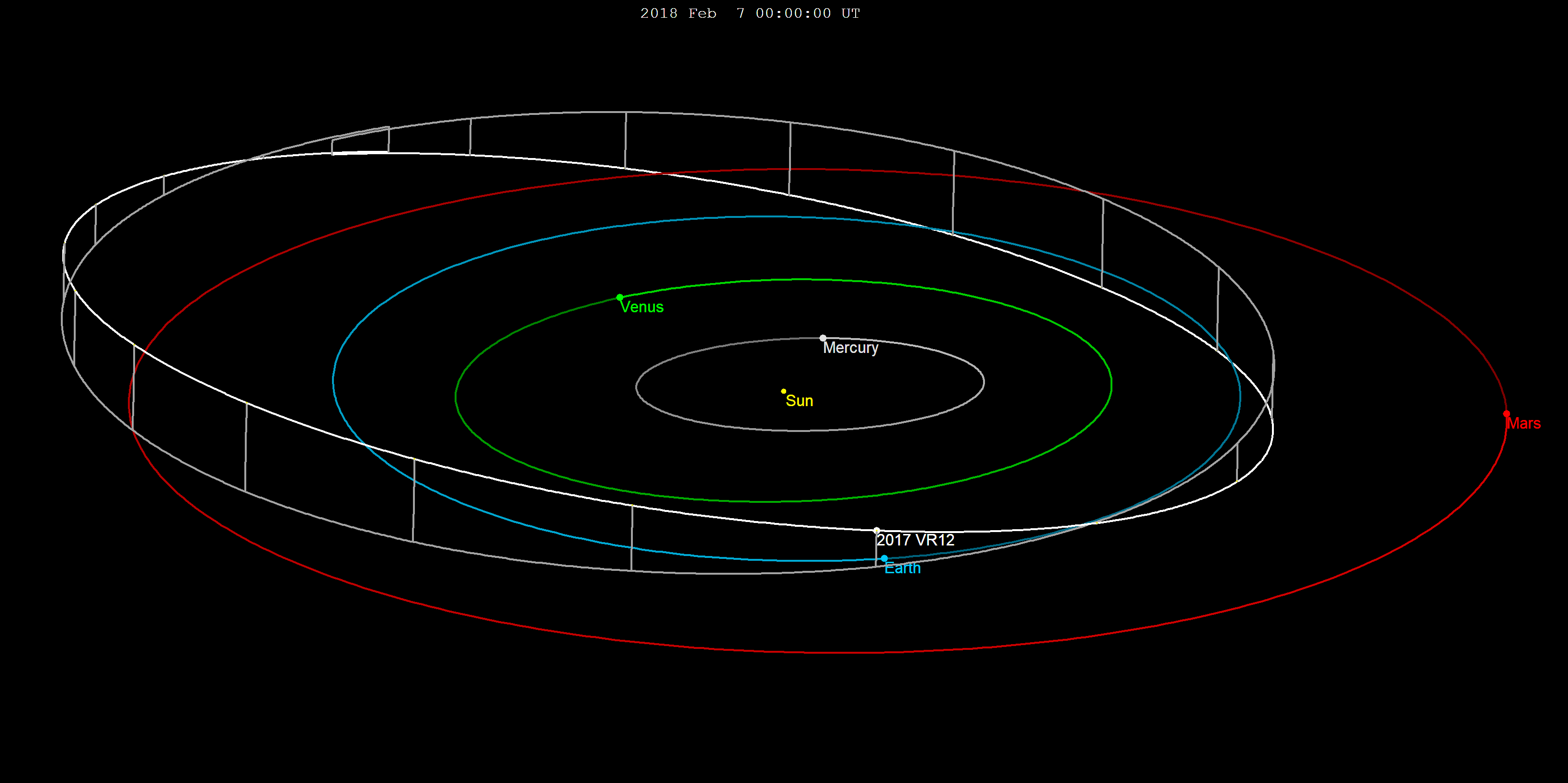
Orbit of 2017 VR_{12}

Animation of 2017 VR_{12}'s orbit from 1 October 2016 to 1 October 2018 2017 VR_{12} · Mercury · Venus · Earth · Mars

2017 VR_{12} passed 0.0097 AU (3.76 lunar distances) from Earth on 7 March 2018, the closest approach by this asteroid currently known. It brightened to 12th magnitude, making it one of the brightest near-Earth asteroids of the year. It was observed by radar from Goldstone, Green Bank and Arecibo Observatory. Images revealed that 2017 VR_{12} is a slightly elongated and angular body with a size of approximately 160 by 100 meters.

== Physical characteristics ==
Images obtained at Green Bank and Arecibo observatories in 2018, revealed that 2017 VR_{12} is a slightly elongated and angular body with a size of approximately 160 by 100 meters.

On 5 March 2018, a rotational lightcurve was obtained from photometric observations by astronomers at the Northolt Branch Observatories. Lightcurve analysis gave a rotation period of 1.5 hours with a brightness amplitude between 0.4 and 0.5 magnitude (U=n.a).

== Gallery ==
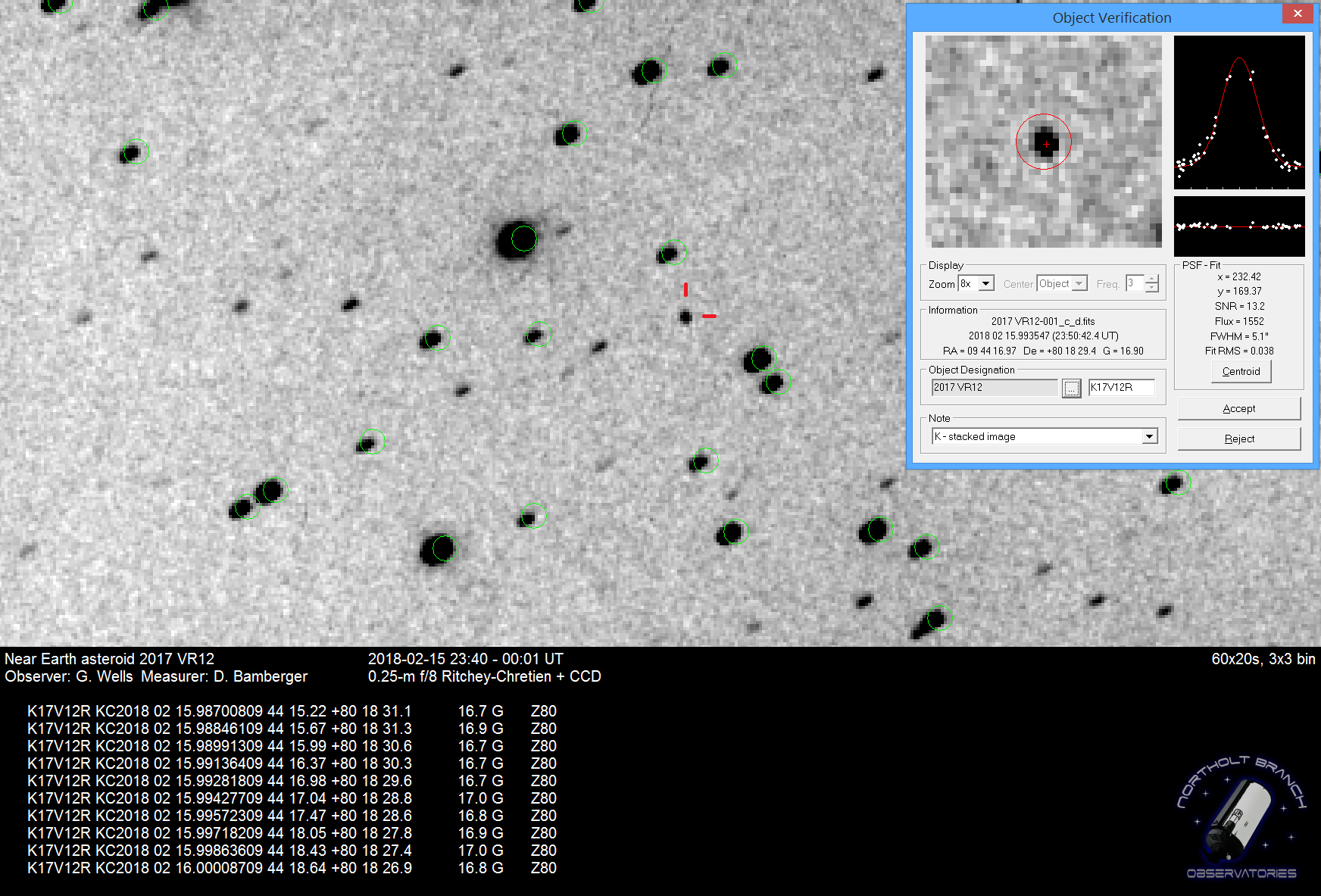
2017 VR_{12}, imaged at Northolt Branch Observatories on 15 February 2018. The asteroid is visible at 17th magnitude at this point, at a distance of 10.4 million km (6.5 million mi) from Earth. The image is inverted (stars appear dark, the background appears light).

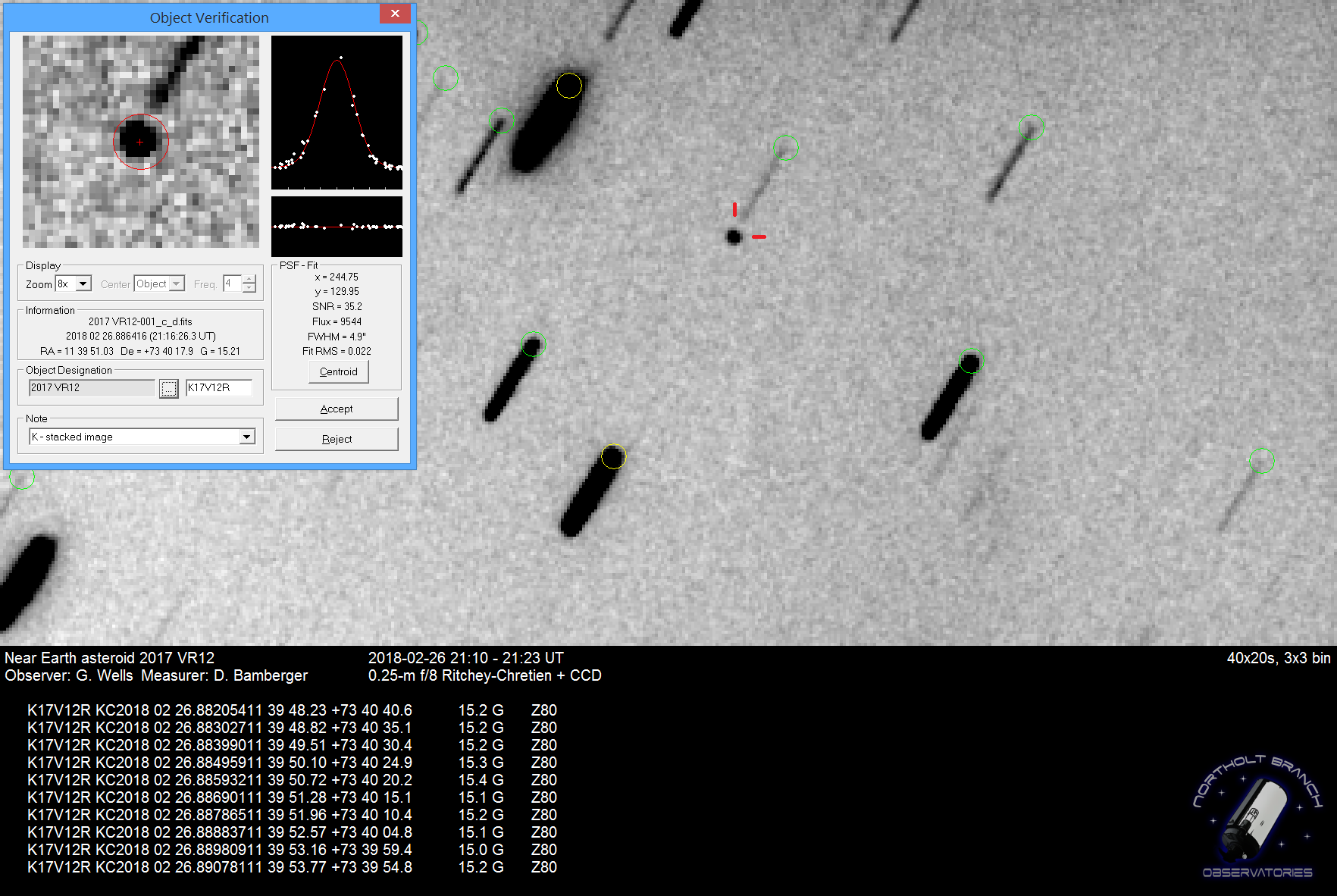
2017 VR_{12} on 26 February 2018. The asteroid is visible at 15th magnitude, at a distance of 4.8 million km (3.0 million miles) from Earth. The telescope is tracking the asteroid, causing stars to trail as the asteroid slowly moves across the sky.

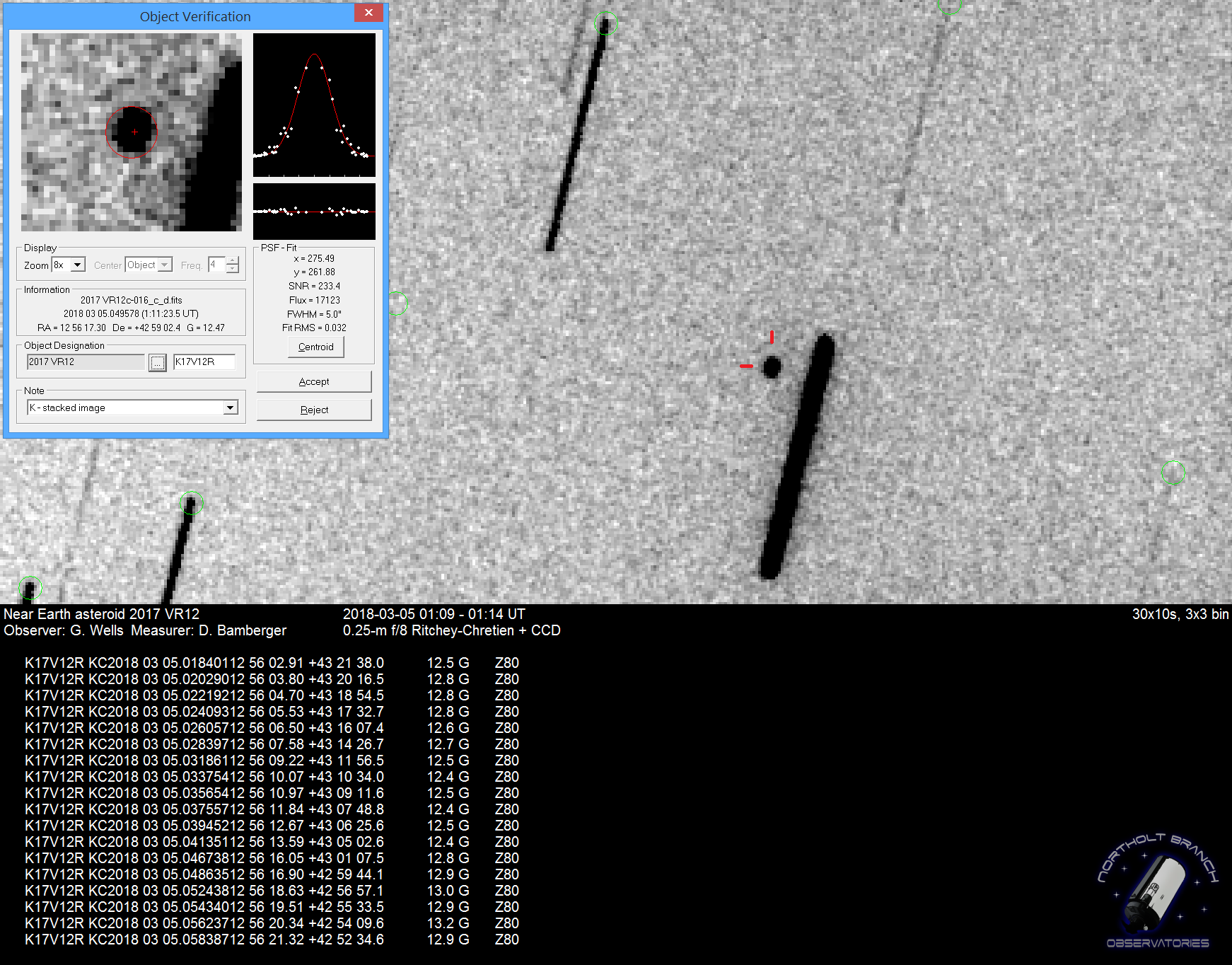
2017 VR_{12} on 5 March 2018, two days before closest approach. The asteroid was 1.9 million km (1.2 million mi) from Earth at that time, visible at 13th magnitude.
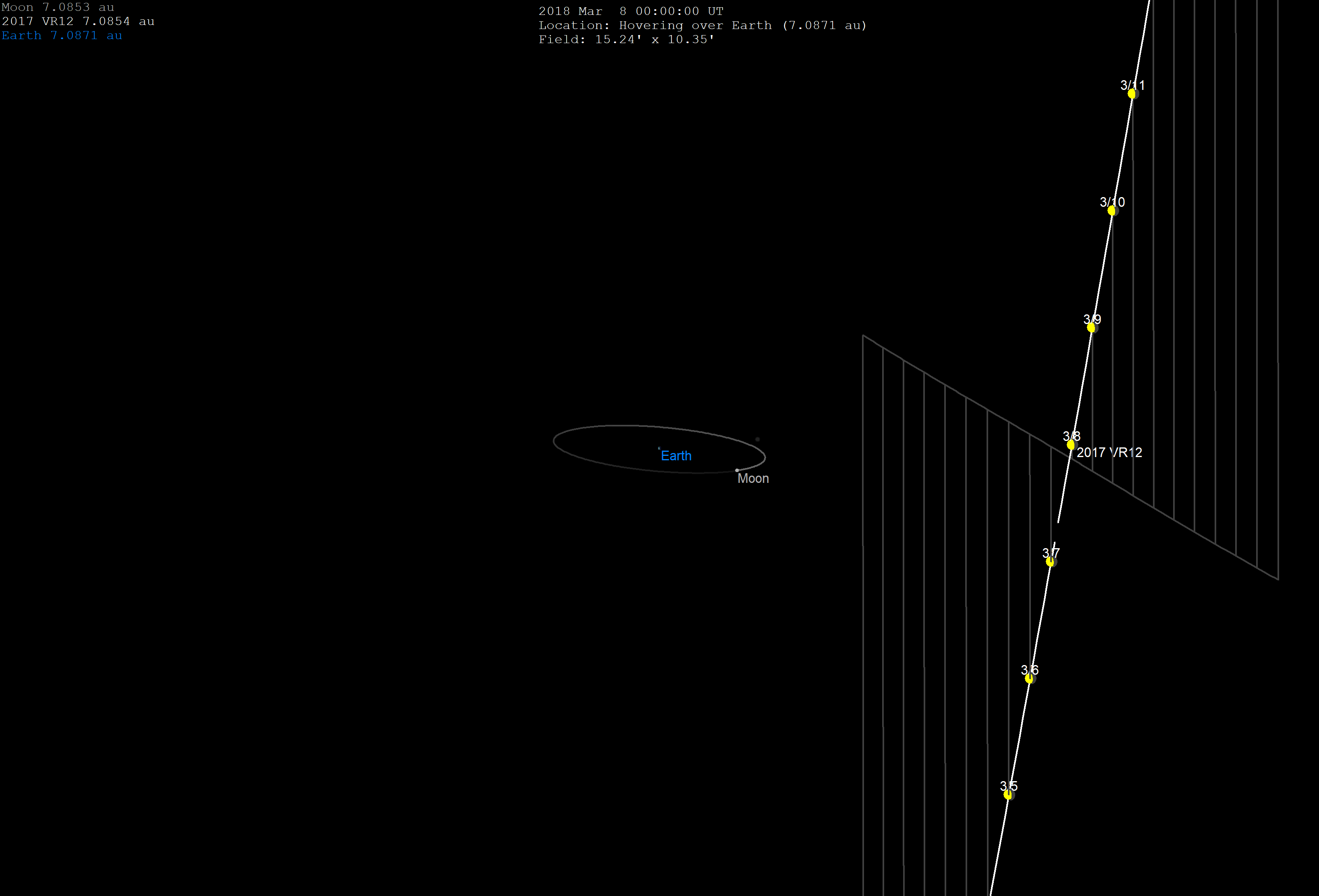
Daily motion outside Moon's orbit.

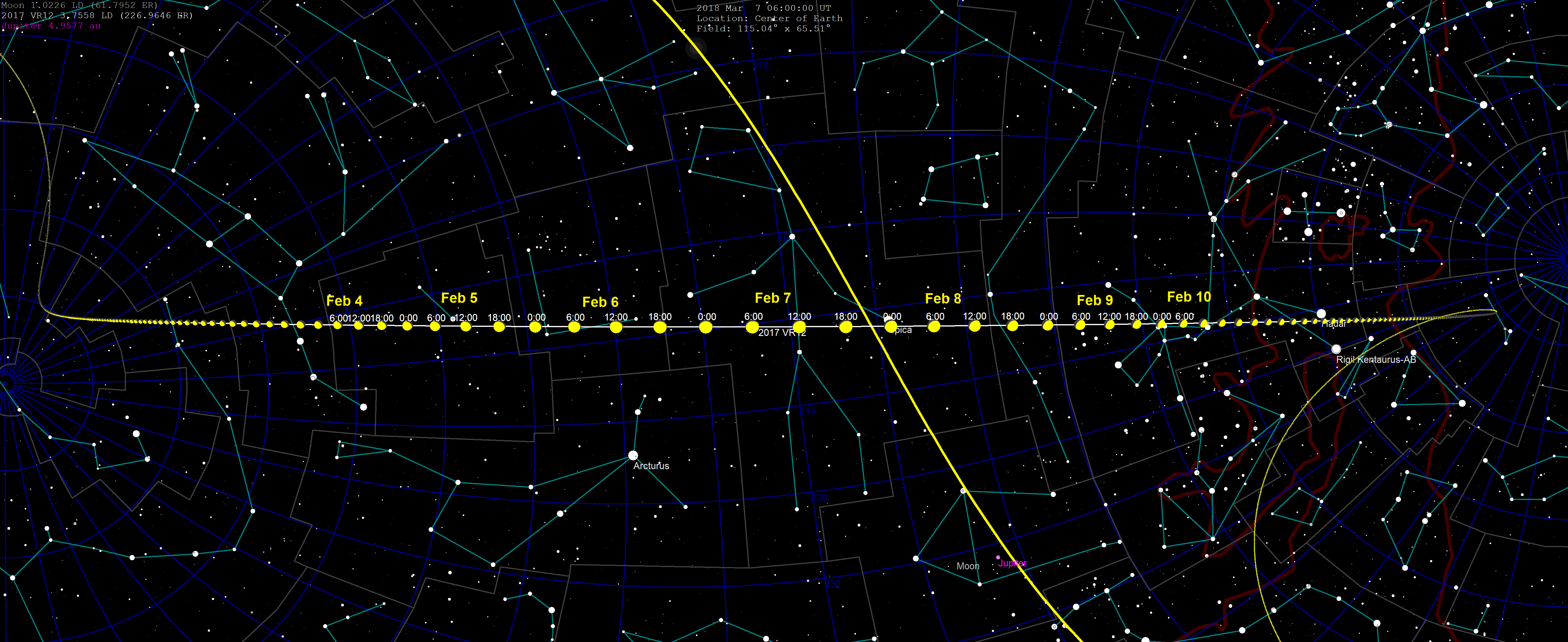
Motion across the sky from north to south during the 6 hours around closest approach.
