= VA245 =

VA245 may refer to:

- Ariane flight VA245, an Ariane 5 launch that occurred on 20 October 2018
- Virgin Australia flight 245, with IATA flight number VA245
- Virginia State Route 245 (VA-245), a primary state highway in the United States
