= BepiColombo =

ESA/JAXA mission to study Mercury in orbit (since 2018)

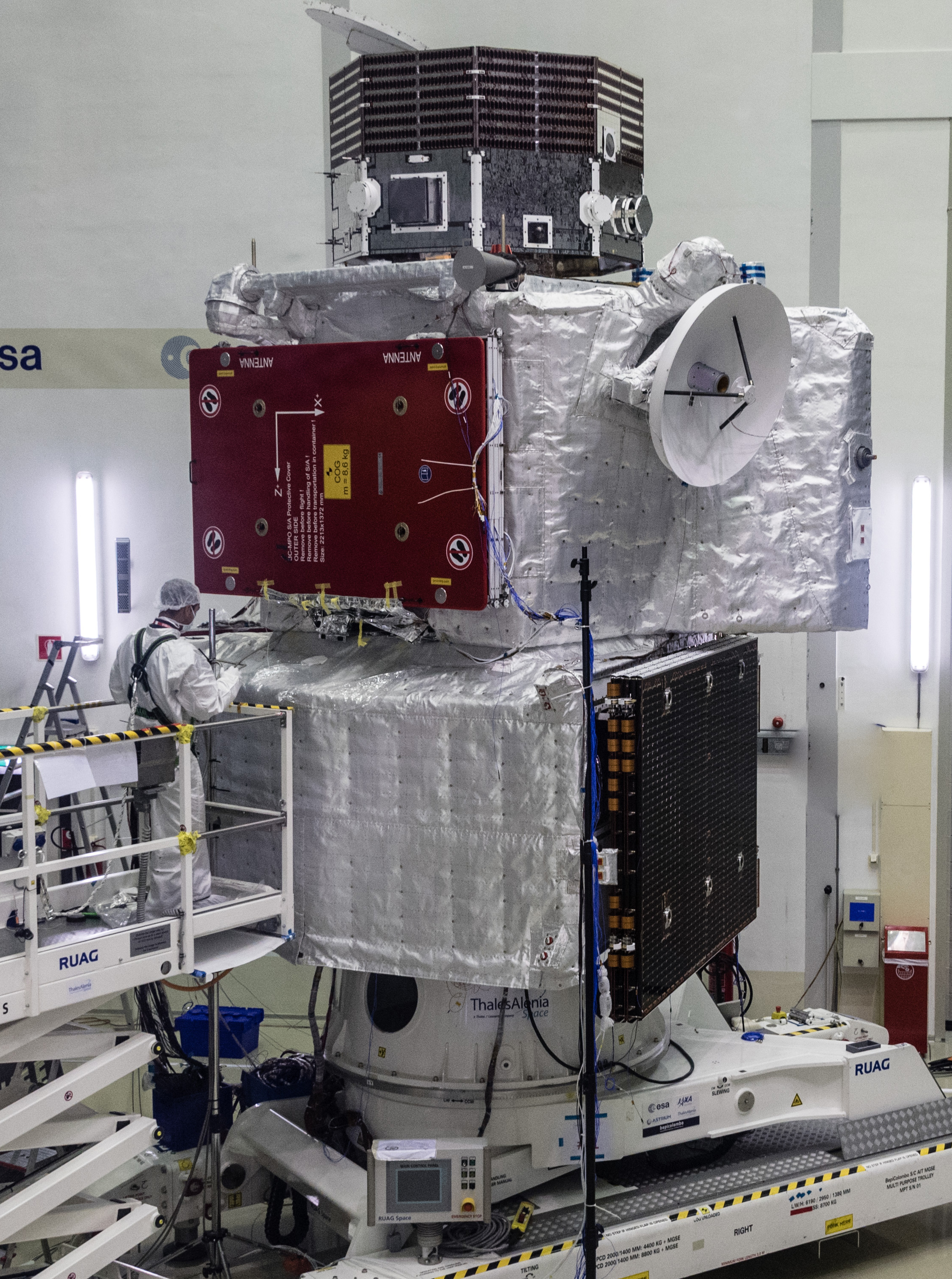
- The BepiColombo spacecraft stack on 5 July 2017. From bottom to top: MTM, MPO, and Mio. Solar arrays are stowed, and MOSIF is not shown.
- Mission type: Planetary science
- Operator: ESA; JAXA
- COSPAR ID: 2018-080A
- SATCAT no.: 43653
- Website: science.esa.int/bepicolombo
- Mission duration: Cruise: 7 years, 2 month, 18 days (planned) 8 years, 1 month, 1 day (actual); Science phase: 1 year (planned); 8 years, 1 month and 2 days (in progress)

Spacecraft properties
- Manufacturer: Airbus; ISAS
- Launch mass: 4,100 kg (9,000 lb)
- BOL mass: MPO: 1,230 kg (2,710 lb); Mio: 255 kg (562 lb)
- Dry mass: 2,700 kg (6,000 lb)
- Dimensions: MPO: 2.4 m × 2.2 m × 1.7 m (7 ft 10 in × 7 ft 3 in × 5 ft 7 in); Mio: 1.8 m × 1.1 m (5 ft 11 in × 3 ft 7 in)
- Power: MPO: 150 watts Mio: 90 watts

Start of mission
- Launch date: 20 October 2018, 01:45 UTC
- Rocket: Ariane 5 ECA (VA245)
- Launch site: Centre Spatial Guyanais, ELA-3
- Contractor: Arianespace

Mercury orbiter
- Spacecraft component: Mercury Planetary Orbiter (MPO)
- Orbital insertion: 21 November 2026

Orbital parameters
- Perihermion altitude: 480 km (300 mi)
- Apohermion altitude: 1,500 km (930 mi)
- Inclination: 90,0°

Mercury orbiter
- Spacecraft component: Mercury Magnetospheric Orbiter (Mio/MMO)
- Orbital insertion: 10 December 2026 (planned deployment from MPO)

Orbital parameters
- Perihermion altitude: 590 km (370 mi)
- Apohermion altitude: 11,640 km (7,230 mi)
- Inclination: 90.0°
- ESA insignia (2020s) Horizon 2000 Plus (Science Programme)

BepiColombo is a joint mission of the European Space Agency (ESA) and the Japan Aerospace Exploration Agency (JAXA) to the planet Mercury. The mission comprises two orbiters: the Mercury Planetary Orbiter (MPO), built and operated by ESA, and Mio (Mercury Magnetospheric Orbiter, MMO), built and operated by JAXA. Together the satellites will perform a comprehensive study of Mercury, including characterization of its magnetic field, magnetosphere, and both interior and surface structure.

During the cruise phase to reach Mercury, the orbiters were in a stacked configuration with two additional components: the Mercury Transfer Module (MTM), which provided power and solar electric propulsion for the cruise, and the Magnetospheric Orbiter Sunshield and Interface (MOSIF), which protects Mio from the harsh solar radiation until it is deployed. MTM was jettisoned on 3 September 2026, and the orbit insertion procedure for the MPO+MMO (Mio) stack was conducted at Mercury on 21 November 2026, albeit with a shorter thruster burn due to a software glitch. The MOSIF will be detached from MPO on 16 December 2026 after the Japanese orbiter MMO (Mio) is deployed on 9–10 December 2026. The scientific phase of the mission is expected to begin in April 2027.

In 2017 the spacecraft's cost was estimated at €1.65 billion (US$1.86 billion). It was launched on an Ariane 5 rocket on 20 October 2018, with Mercury orbit insertion planned for December 2025, after a flyby of Earth, two flybys of Venus, and six flybys of Mercury. In 2024, due to a power-related anomaly limiting the thrust levels on its solar electric propulsion system, Mercury arrival was delayed to November 2026.

== Overview ==
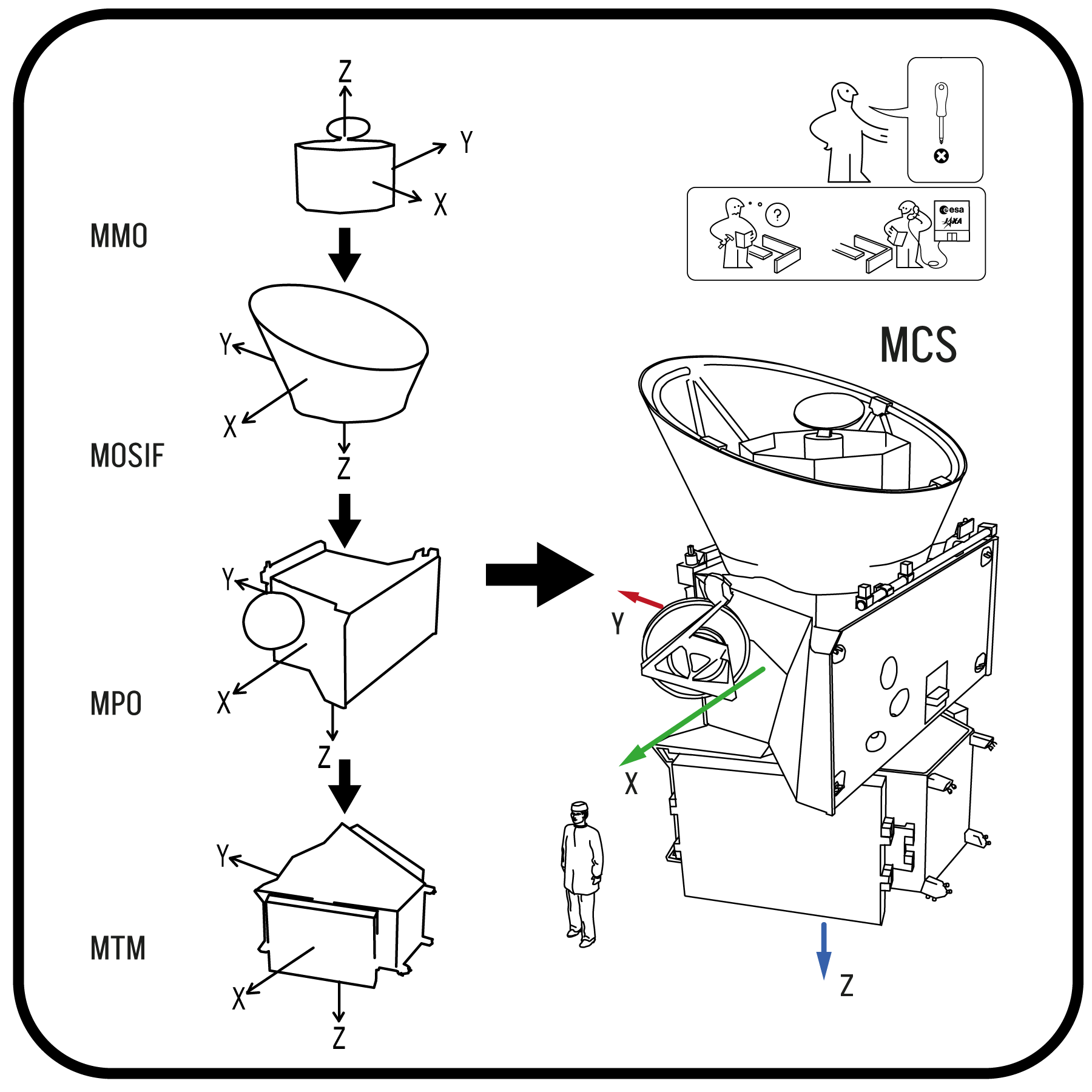
Four components of the BepiColombo Mercury Composite Spacecraft (MCS)

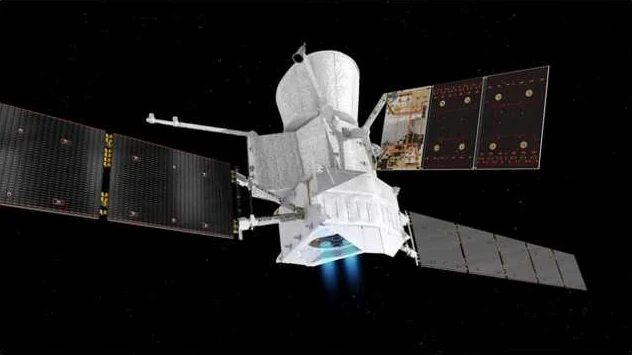
BepiColombo in cruise configuration

The mission involves four components, including two orbiters which will separate into independent spacecraft upon arrival at Mercury:

- Mercury Transfer Module (MTM) providing chemical and solar electric propulsion, by ESA
- Mercury Planetary Orbiter (MPO), built by ESA
- Mercury Magnetospheric Orbiter (MMO) or Mio, by JAXA
- Magnetospheric Orbiter Sunshield and Interface (MOSIF) to protect Mio during cruise, by ESA

During the launch and cruise phases, these four components were joined to form the Mercury Composite Spacecraft (MCS)

The stacked spacecraft took eight years to position itself to enter Mercury orbit. During this time it used solar electric propulsion and nine gravity assists, flying past the Earth and Moon in April 2020, Venus in 2020 and 2021, and six Mercury flybys between 2021 and 2025.

Expected to arrive in Mercury orbit in November 2026, the Mio and MPO satellites will separate and observe Mercury in collaboration for one year, with a possible one-year extension. Although originally expected to enter orbit in December 2025, thruster issues discovered in September 2024 before the fourth Mercury flyby resulted in a delayed arrival of November 2026.

ESA is responsible for the overall mission, the design, development assembly and test of the propulsion and MPO modules, and the launch. The two orbiters are operated by mission controllers based in Darmstadt, Germany. The first spacecraft operations manager of BepiColombo was Elsa Montagnon, who held the position until she was promoted to mission manager by the second Mercury flyby on June 2022. Her deputy Emanuela Bordoni acted as operations manager shortly after the second Mercury flyby, and Montagnon's post was replaced by Ignacio Clerigo by 20 June 2023. ESA's Cebreros, Spain 35-metre (115 ft) ground station is the primary ground facility for communications during all mission phases.

=== Naming ===
BepiColombo is named after Giuseppe "Bepi" Colombo (1920–1984), a scientist, mathematician, and engineer at the University of Padua, Italy, who proposed the interplanetary gravity assist manoeuvre used by the 1974 Mariner 10 mission, a technique often used since then by other planetary probes.

Mio, the name of the Mercury Magnetospheric Orbiter, was selected from thousands of suggestions by the Japanese public. In Japanese, mio (澪) means a waterway, and according to JAXA, it symbolizes the research and development milestones reached thus far, and wishes for safe travel ahead. JAXA said the spacecraft will travel through the solar wind just like a ship traveling through the ocean. In Chinese and Japanese, Mercury is known as the "water star" (水星) according to wǔxíng.

=== Scientific objectives ===
The main objectives of the mission are:

- Study the origin and evolution of a planet close to its parent star
- Study Mercury's form, interior, structure, geology, composition and craters
- Investigate Mercury's exosphere, composition and dynamics, including generation and escape
- Study Mercury's magnetised envelope (magnetosphere) – structure and dynamics
- Investigate the origin of Mercury's magnetic field
- Test Einstein's theory of general relativity by measuring the parameters gamma and beta of the parameterized post-Newtonian formalism with high accuracy.

Mercury is too small and hot for its gravity to retain any significant atmosphere over long periods of time, but it has a tenuous surface-bounded exosphere containing hydrogen, helium, oxygen, sodium, calcium, potassium and other trace elements. Its exosphere is not stable as atoms are continuously lost and replenished from a variety of sources. The mission will study the exosphere composition and dynamics, including generation and escape.

The orbiters are equipped with scientific instruments provided by various European countries and Japan. The mission is designed to characterize the solid and liquid iron core (3/4 of the planet's radius) and determine the size of each as well as to perform gravitational and magnetic field mappings. Russia provided the gamma ray and neutron spectrometer (MGNS) to test the presence of water ice in polar craters that are permanently in shadow from the Sun's rays.

== Launch and operations ==
BepiColombo, imaged at Northolt Branch Observatories, 16 hours after the Earth flyby. The bright satellite passing by is INSAT-2D.

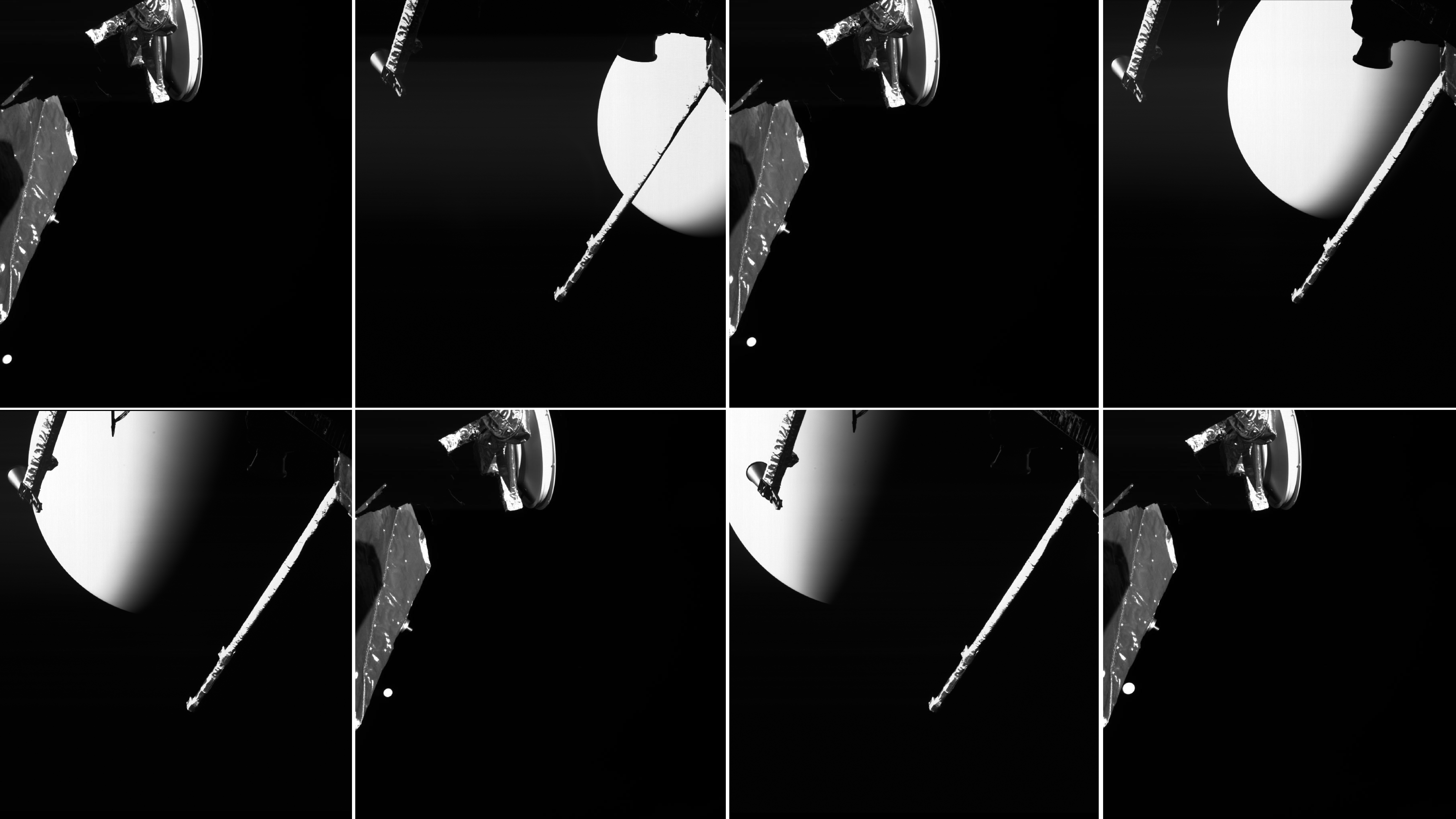
Venus during the 15 October 2020 flyby

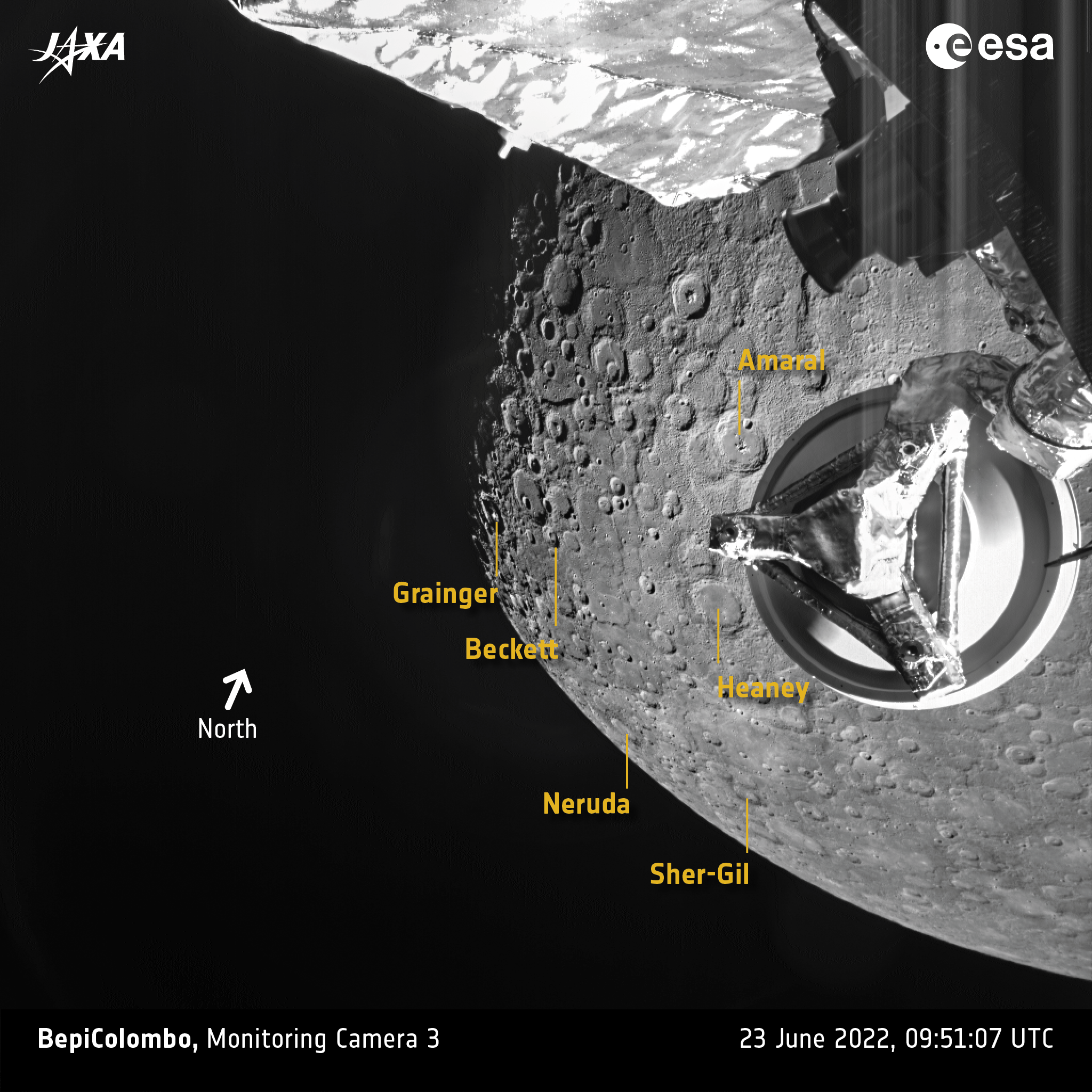
Mercury on 23 June 2022 during the 2nd gravity assist at the planet

=== Before launch ===
The BepiColombo mission proposal was selected by ESA in 2000. A request for proposals for the science payload was issued in 2004. In 2007, Astrium (now Airbus Defence and Space) was selected as the prime contractor, and Ariane 5 chosen as the launch vehicle. The mission was approved in November 2009, after years in proposal and planning as part of the European Space Agency's Horizon 2000+ programme. The initial target launch of July 2014 was postponed several times, mostly because of delays on the development of the solar electric propulsion system. BepiColombo is the last mission of the programme to be launched.

=== Launch ===
The two orbiters were successfully launched together on 20 October 2018. The launch took place on Ariane flight VA245 from Europe's Spaceport in Kourou, French Guiana.

=== Gravity assist maneuvers ===
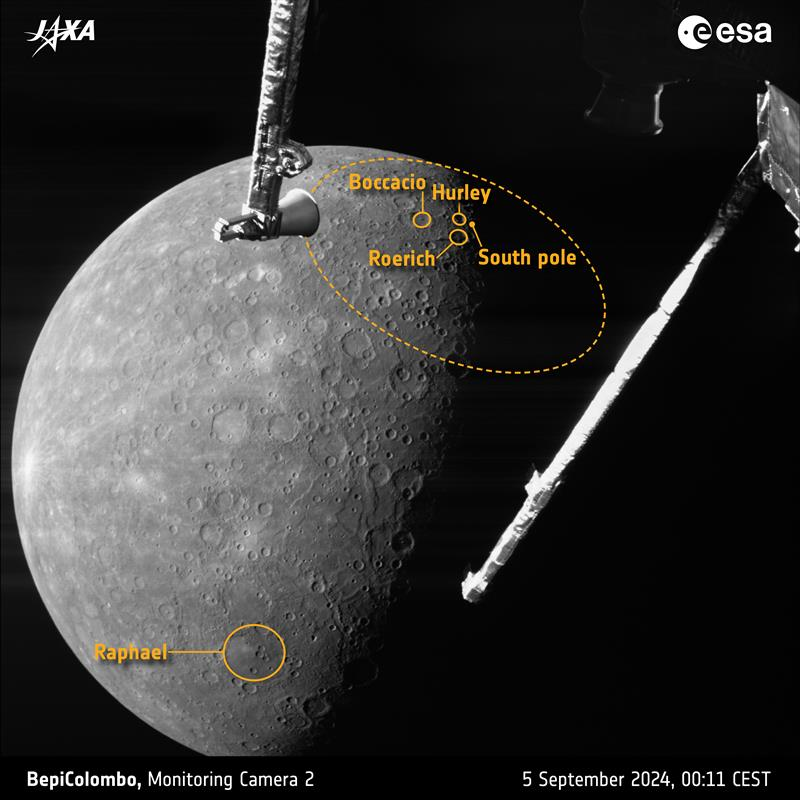
Mercury on 5 September 2024 during the 4th gravity assist at the planet

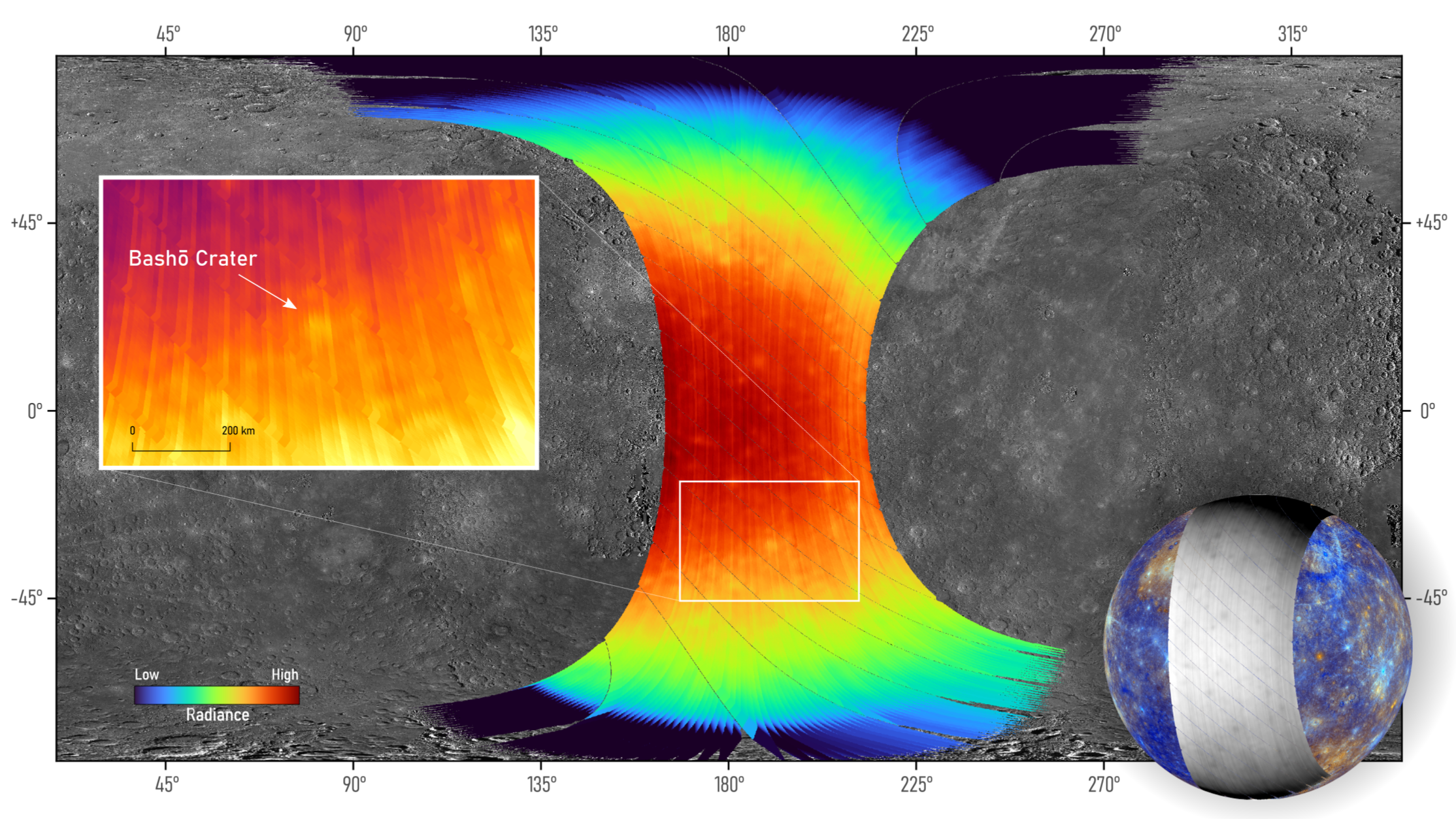
Mercury in mid-infrared light, 1 December 2024

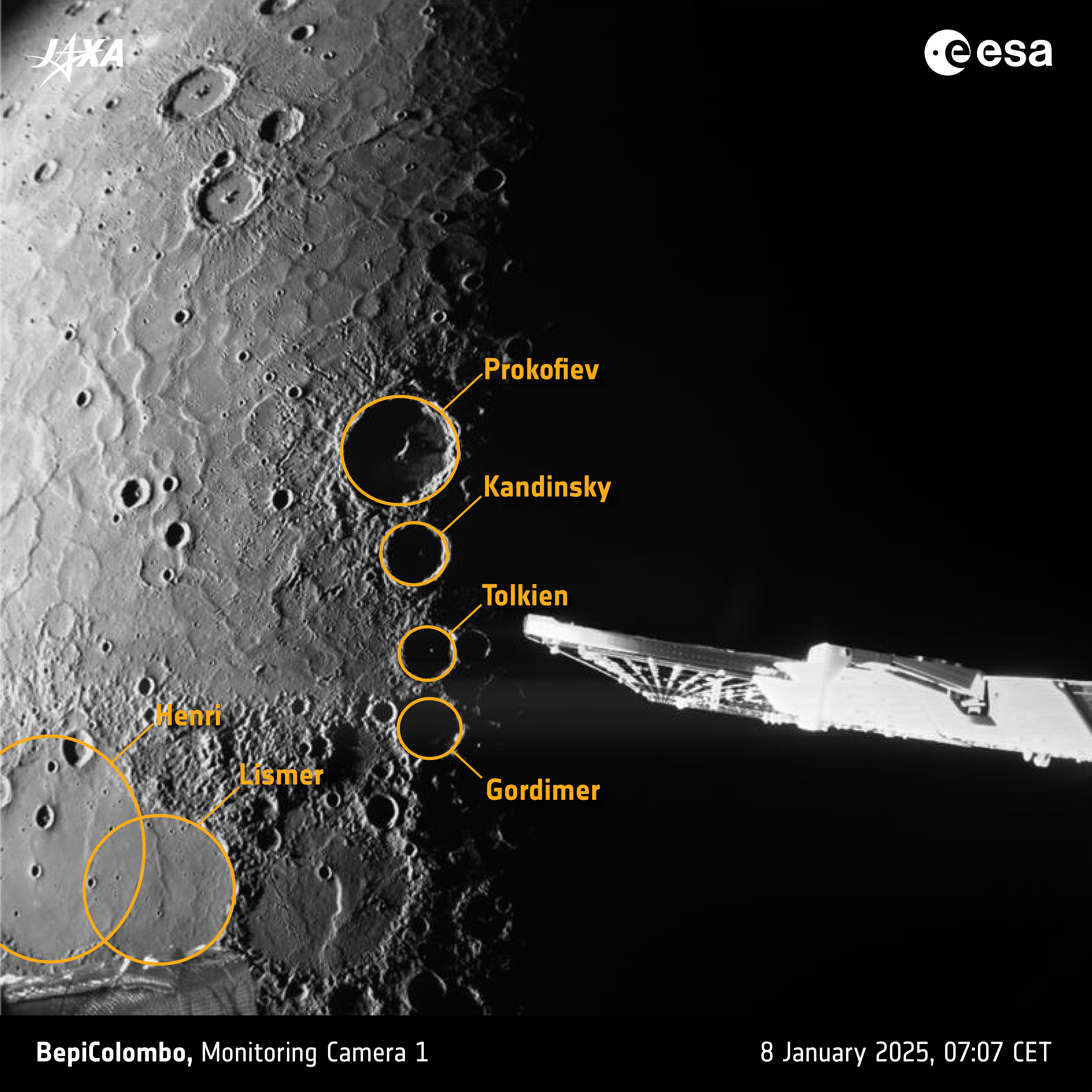
Mercury's north pole on 8 January 2025 during the 6th and final gravity assist at the planet

The stacked spacecraft left Earth with a hyperbolic excess velocity of 3.475 km/s (2.159 mi/s). Initially, the craft was placed in a heliocentric orbit similar to that of Earth. After both the spacecraft and Earth completed one and a half orbits, it returned to Earth to perform a gravity-assist maneuver and was deflected towards Venus.

Following its Earth flyby in April 2020, BepiColombo was briefly mistaken for a near-Earth asteroid, receiving the provisional designation 2020 GL_{2}.

Two consecutive Venus flybys reduced the perihelion near to the Sun–Mercury distance with almost no need for thrust. A sequence of six Mercury flybys lowered the relative velocity to 1.76 km/s (1.09 mi/s). After the fourth Mercury flyby in 2024, the spacecraft is in an orbit similar to that of Mercury and remains in the general vicinity of the planet.

=== Science during Venus flybys ===
After the potential biomarker phosphine was tentatively discovered in the Venusian atmosphere in September 2020, ESA scientists suggested that BepiColombo might be able to detect the compound during its two Venus flybys in 2020 and 2021. However, it was not clear if the spacecraft's instruments were sufficiently sensitive and there has been no announcement of results. Since then, the claimed September 2020 detection has been disputed by follow-up studies.

During the first Venus flyby in October 2020, seven science instruments and a radiation monitor onboard the Mercury Planetary Orbiter, and three instruments onboard Mio, were active and gathering data. The observations were coordinated with JAXA's Akatsuki, the only active spacecraft orbiting Venus at that time, as well as Earth-based observatories.

The second Venus flyby in August 2021 happened only 33 hours after another interplanetary spacecraft by ESA, Solar Orbiter, completed its gravity assist at the same planet. Both spacecraft used their science instruments to study the magnetic, plasma, and particle environment around Venus during their flybys, offering unique multipoint datasets. The MPO's MERTIS instrument captured high resolution spectra of the Venus atmosphere and the Mercury Transfer Module's three monitoring cameras (M-CAM) captured a series of black-and-white images of the planet, documenting the various phases of the flyby.

=== Science during Mercury flybys ===
During the first Mercury flyby in October 2021, the spacecraft captured its first images of the target planet using the M-CAM monitoring cameras on the Mercury Transfer Module. Some of the scientific instruments on both orbiters were also active during the flyby, exploring the magnetic and particle environment around Mercury and measuring the planet's gravity.

During the second flyby in June 2022, the M-CAM cameras imaged, among other targets, the crater Heaney with a candidate volcano, an important target for the spacecraft's primary mission. This crater has been recently named after Seamus Heaney following a request from the M-CAM team. Some of the scientific instruments have been again active, measuring the magnetic, plasma, and particle environment around the spacecraft.

During the third flyby in June 2023, the MPPE suite of instruments on Mio was used to map the magnetosphere of Mercury. Based on these data, scientists described various expected features of the magnetosphere, but also made new discoveries: 1) a low latitude layer containing particles with much broader energy range than ever observed on Mercury, 2) energetic hydrogen ions trapped at low latitude and near the equator, and 3) cold plasma ions of oxygen and sodium, as well as signatures of potassium, which were probably ejected from the planet's surface by micrometeorites or the solar wind. Mio's observations during this flyby also identified the chirping-like discrete whistler-mode emission waves previously observed in Earth's magnetosphere but so far unknown from Mercury.

In May 2024, computers on BepiColombo (as well as on another ESA mission, Mars Express) reported a sharp increase in the number of memory errors, coinciding with a massive solar flare from the active region AR3664, at that time facing away from Earth. The event was also observed in detail by ESA's Solar Orbiter.

During the fourth flyby in September 2024, the spacecraft had, for the first time, a clear view of Mercury's south pole. The M-CAM 2 and 3 cameras provided images of the polar region, as well as the Vivaldi crater and a crater newly named Stoddart after Margaret Olrog Stoddart following a request from the M-CAM team. The altitude of the flyby (165 km) was even lower than the expected final science orbit of MPO and it coincided with elevated fluxes of high-energy charged solar particles. Scientists used this opportunity to study how these particles interacted with molecules on the surface, using the SIXS instrument.

During the fifth flyby in December 2024, using the MERTIS instrument, BepiColombo became the first spacecraft ever to observe Mercury in mid-infrared light. During the sixth and final Mercury flyby in January 2025, the M-CAM 1 camera imaged the permanently shadowed craters Prokofiev, Kandinsky, Tolkien, and Gordimer near the planet's north pole.

=== Thruster issues ===
On 15 May 2024, ESA reported an issue preventing the spacecraft's thrusters from operating at full power during a scheduled manoeuvre on 26 April 2024. On 2 September 2024, ESA reported that to compensate for the reduced available thrust, a revised trajectory had been developed that would add 11 months to the cruise, delaying the expected arrival date from 5 December 2025 to November 2026.

=== Arrival at Mercury ===
BepiColombo delivering "selfie style" footage via its Mercury Transfer Module

On 15 June 2026 at 13:24 UTC, BepiColombo switched off its solar electric propulsion for the last time in preparation for the Mercury Arrival Phase starting in September. Also in June, BepiColombo teams started a series of arrival simulations at ESOC. On 3 September 2026, the Mercury Transfer Module successfully separated from the two orbiters, marking the beginning of the Mercury Arrival Phase. On 15 September 2026, the MPO's multipurpose imaging instrument SIMBIO-SYS marked its first light, confirming that it is operating correctly. On 24 September 2026, the remaining stack performed a 11.4 m/s trajectory correction, testing the MPO's propulsion system before the planned orbit insertion.

The capture of the spacecraft by Mercury's gravity into polar orbit occurred in November 2026. On 21 November 2026, at 18:24 UTC, four thrusters fired so that the spacecraft was captured into orbit about Mercury. ESA's flight controllers in Germany confirmed the orbital capture several hours later. The thruster burn was shorter than the expected 37 minutes due to a software issue. However, the spacecraft stack remained safe and entered an orbit around the planet. The orbiters are planned to then separate on 9–10 December and will adjust their orbits using chemical thrusters.

== Trajectory and timeline ==
As of September 2026, the mission schedule is:

Date	Event	Flyby altitude	Comment
20 October 2018, 01:45 UTC	Launch	–	From Guyana Space Center on Ariane 5 flight VA254
10 April 2020, 04:25 UTC	Earth flyby	12,700 km (7,900 mi)	1.5 years after launch
15 October 2020, 03:58 UTC	First Venus flyby	10,720 km (6,660 mi)	
10 August 2021, 13:52 UTC	Second Venus flyby	552 km (343 mi)	1.35 Venus years after first Venus flyby
1 October 2021, 23:35 UTC	First Mercury flyby	199 km (124 mi)	Occurred on the 101st anniversary of Giuseppe Colombo’s birth
23 June 2022, 09:44 UTC	Second Mercury flyby	200 km (120 mi)	~2 orbits (3 Mercury years) after 1st Mercury flyby
19 June 2023, 19:34 UTC	Third Mercury flyby	236 km (147 mi)	~3 orbits (4.1 Mercury years) after 2nd Mercury flyby
4 September 2024, 21:48 UTC	Fourth Mercury flyby	165 km (103 mi)	~4 orbits (5.0 Mercury years) after 3rd Mercury flyby
1 December 2024, 14:23 UTC	Fifth Mercury flyby	37,626 km (23,380 mi)	1 orbit (1.0 Mercury year) after 4th Mercury flyby
8 January 2025, 05:59 UTC	Sixth Mercury flyby	295 km (183 mi)	~0.4 orbits (0.4 Mercury years) after 5th Mercury flyby
3 September 2026, 12:00 UTC	MTM separation	–	First Mercury arrival manoeuvre
21 November 2026, 18:24 UTC	Mercury orbit insertion	–	7.8 Mercury years after 6th Mercury flyby; 60-hour orbital period
10 December 2026	MMO reaches science orbit, detaches from MPO	–	9.3-hour orbital period
Early 2027	MPO reaches science orbit	–	2.36-hour orbital period
April 2028	End of nominal mission	–	
December 2029	End of planned extended mission	–	

Timeline of BepiColombo from 20 October 2018 to 2 November 2025. Red circle indicates flybys.

Animation of BepiColombo's trajectory from 20 October 2018 to 2 November 2025
BepiColombo · Earth · Venus · Mercury · Sun
For more detailed animation, see this video

Animation of BepiColombo's trajectory around Mercury

Planned orbits for Mio and MPO, the two probes of the BepiColombo mission

== Spacecraft design and components ==
=== Mercury Transfer Module ===
QinetiQ T6 performance
Type	Kaufman ion engine
Units on board	4
Diameter	22 cm (8.7 in)
Max. thrust	145 mN each
Specific impulse (I_{sp})	4300 seconds
Propellant	Xenon
Total power	4628 W

The Mercury Transfer Module (MTM) had a mass of 2,615 kg (5,765 lb), including 1,400 kg (3,100 lb) of xenon propellant, and was located at the base of the stack. Its role was to carry the two science orbiters to Mercury and to support them during the cruise.

The MTM was equipped with a solar electric propulsion system as the main spacecraft propulsion. Its four QinetiQ-T6 ion thrusters operated singly or in pairs for a maximum combined thrust of 290 mN, making it the most powerful ion engine array ever operated in space. The MTM supplied electrical power for the two stacked orbiters as well as for its solar electric propulsion system thanks to two 14-metre-long (46 ft) solar panels. The MTM solar arrays generated power up to 14 kW at their peak output, with 10.6 KW required to power the solar electric propulsion system.

The solar electric propulsion system has typically very high specific impulse and low thrust. This leads to a flight profile with months-long continuous low-thrust braking phases, interrupted by planetary gravity assists, to gradually reduce the velocity of the spacecraft. Prior to Mercury orbit insertion, the MTM was jettisoned from the spacecraft stack. After separation from the MTM, the MPO provides Mio all necessary power and data resources until Mio is delivered to its mission orbit. Separation of Mio from MPO will be accomplished by spin-ejection.

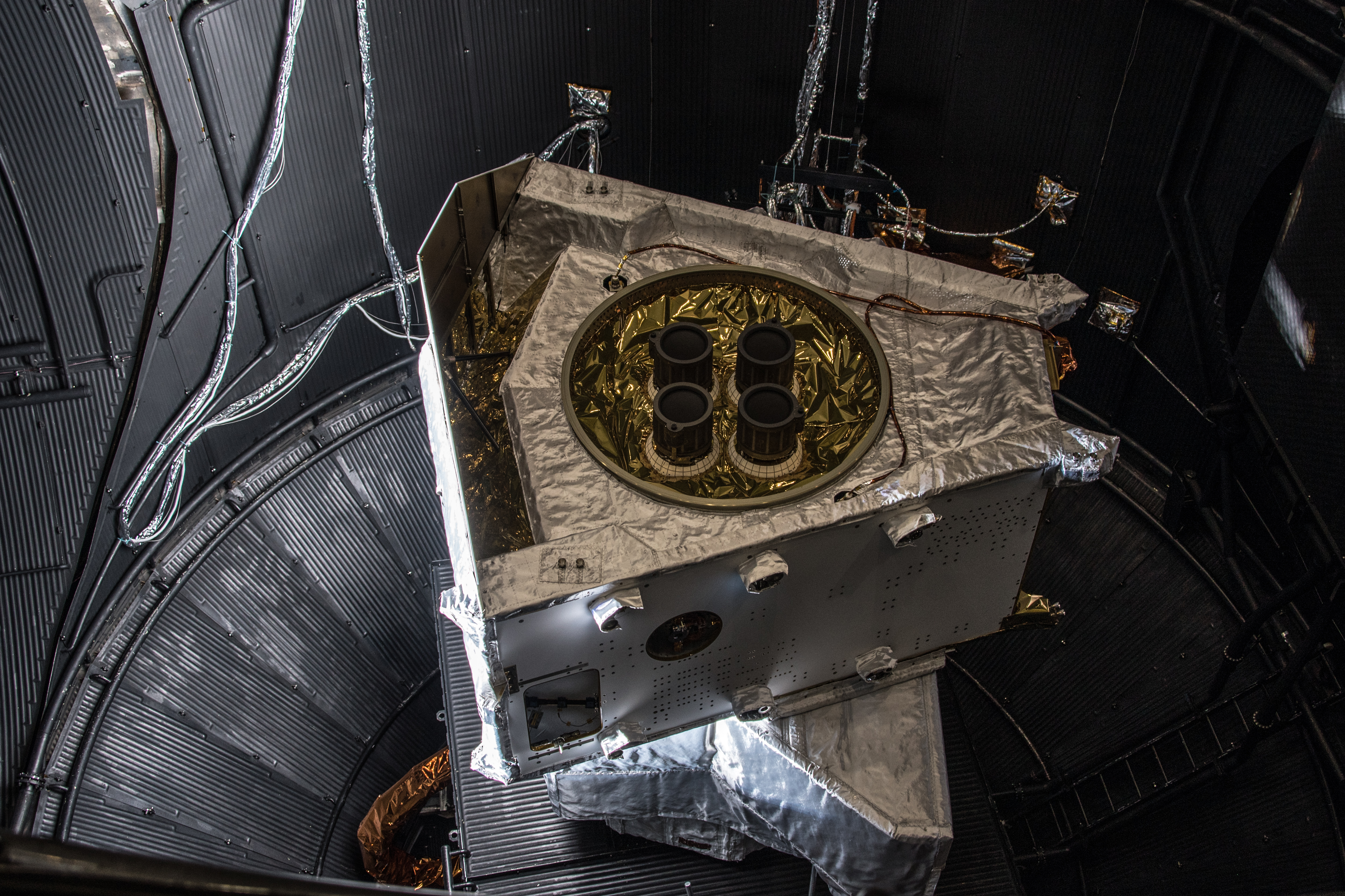
MTM in space simulator

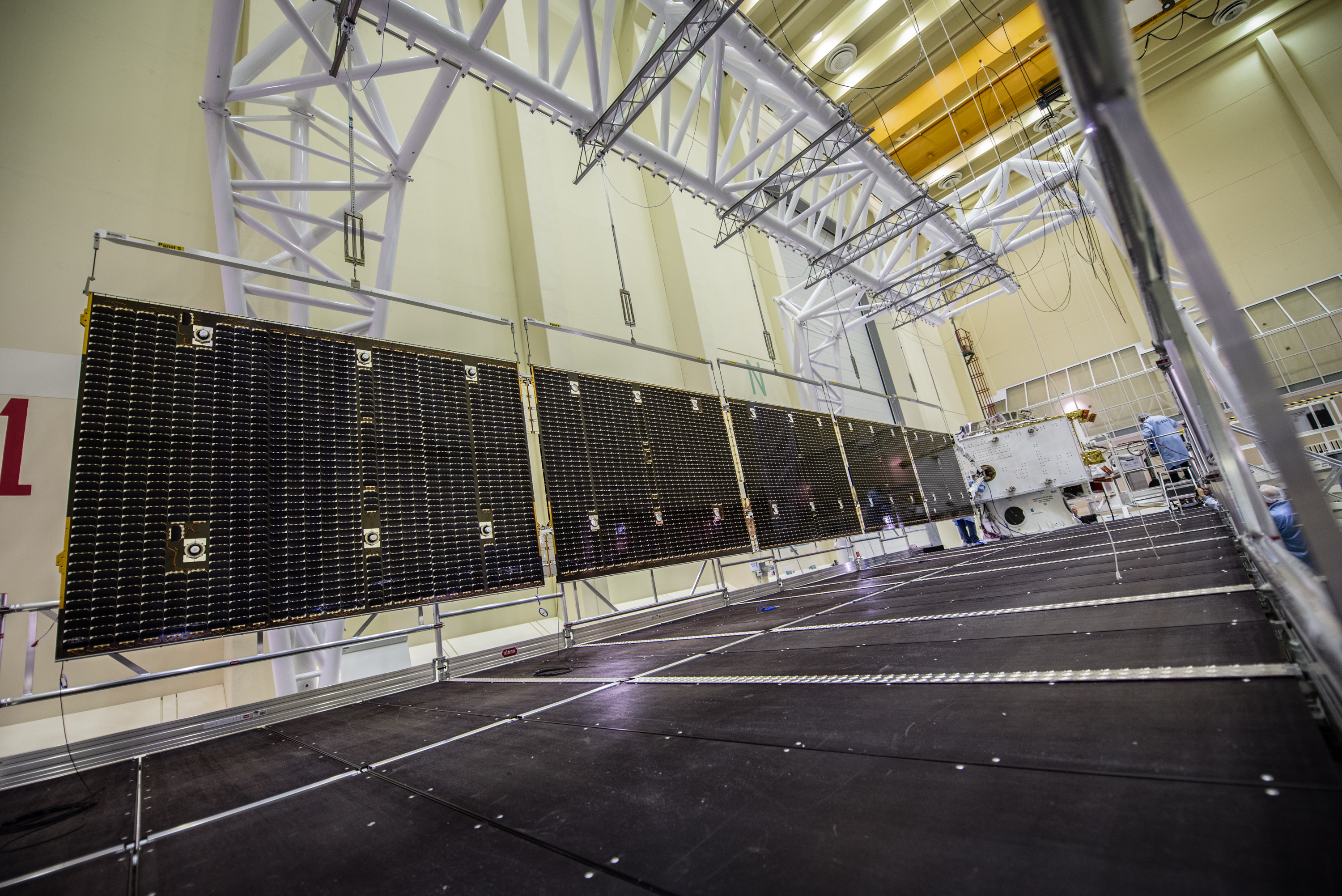
MTM solar wing deployment

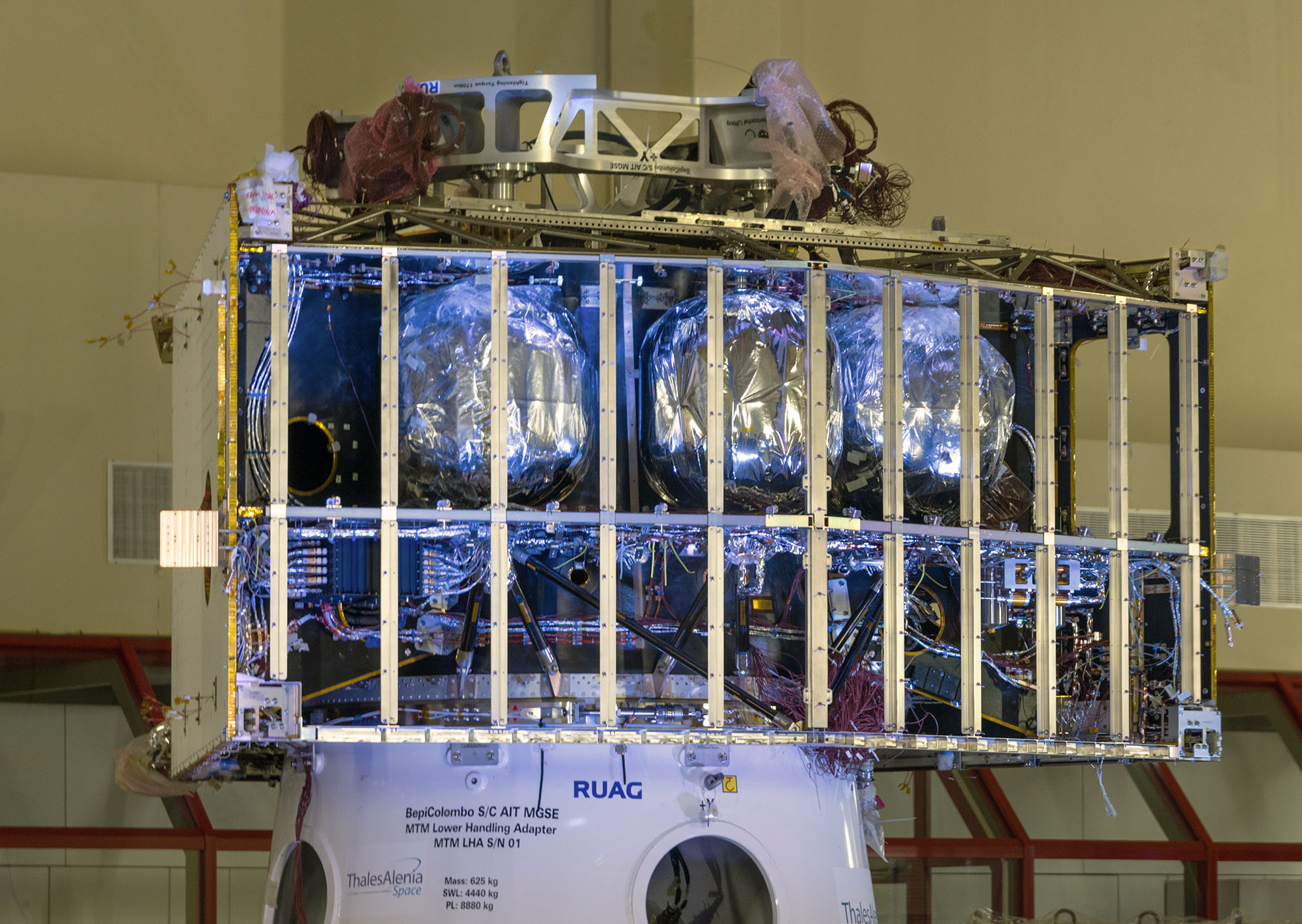
MTM at ESTEC

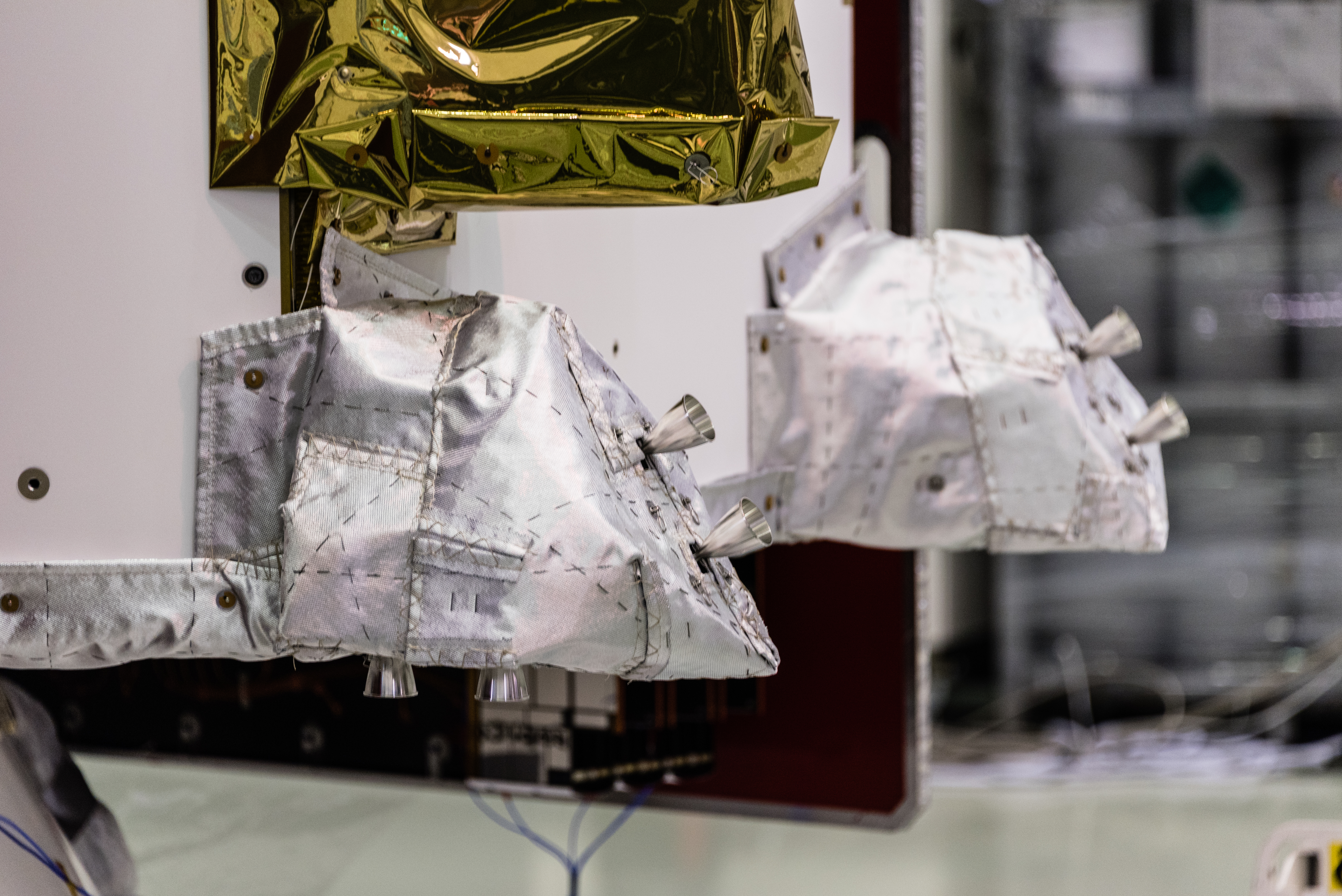
MTM thruster detail

=== Mercury Planetary Orbiter ===
The Mercury Planetary Orbiter (MPO) has a mass of 1,150 kg (2,540 lb) and uses a single-sided solar array capable of providing up to 1000 watts and featuring optical solar reflectors to keep its temperature below 200 °C (392 °F). The solar array requires continuous rotation keeping the Sun at a low incidence angle in order to generate adequate power while at the same time limiting the temperature.

The MPO carries a payload of 11 instruments, comprising cameras, spectrometers (IR, UV, X-ray, γ-ray, neutron), a radiometer, a laser altimeter, a magnetometer, particle analysers, a Ka-band transponder, and an accelerometer. The payload components are mounted on the nadir side of the spacecraft to achieve low detector temperatures, apart from the MERTIS and PHEBUS spectrometers located directly at the main radiator to provide a better field of view.

A high-temperature-resistant 1.0 m (3 ft 3 in) diameter high-gain antenna is mounted on a short boom on the zenith side of the spacecraft. Communications will be on the X-band and Ka-band with an average bit rate of 50 kbit/s and a total data volume of 1550 Gbit/year. ESA's Cebreros, Spain 35-metre (115 ft) ground station is planned to be the primary ground facility for communications during all mission phases.

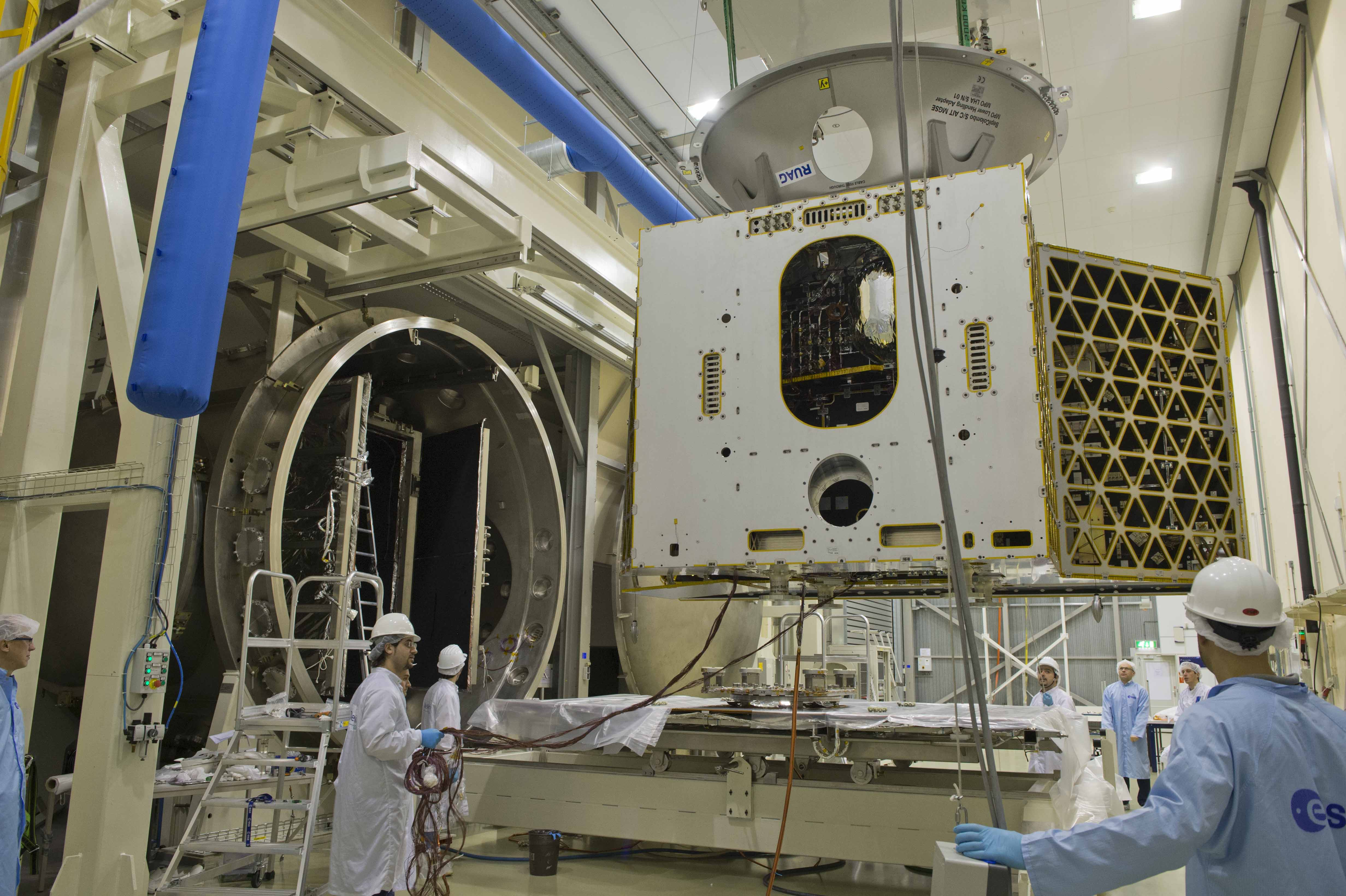
MPO being placed in Phenix thermal vacuum test facility

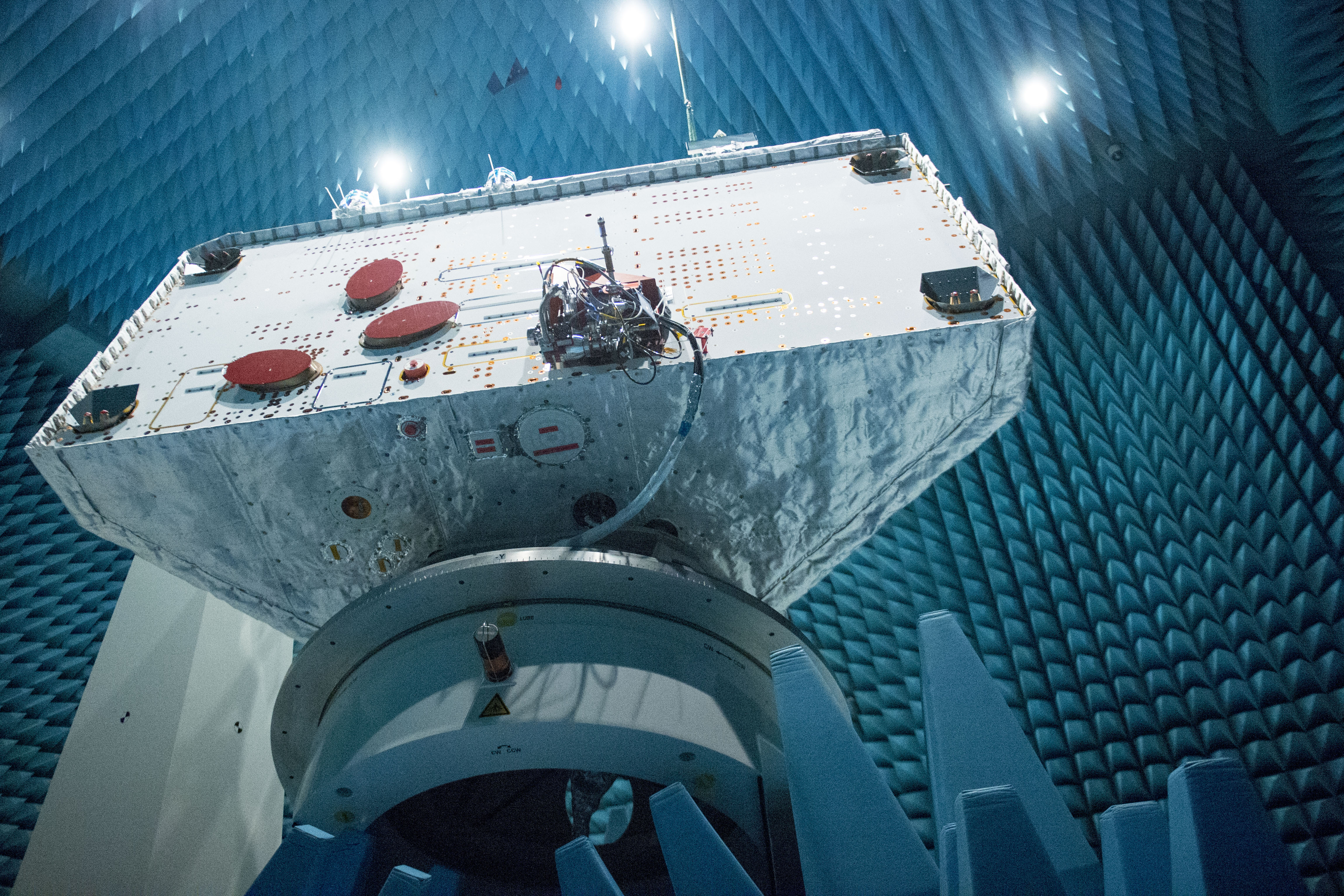
Radio testing of MPO

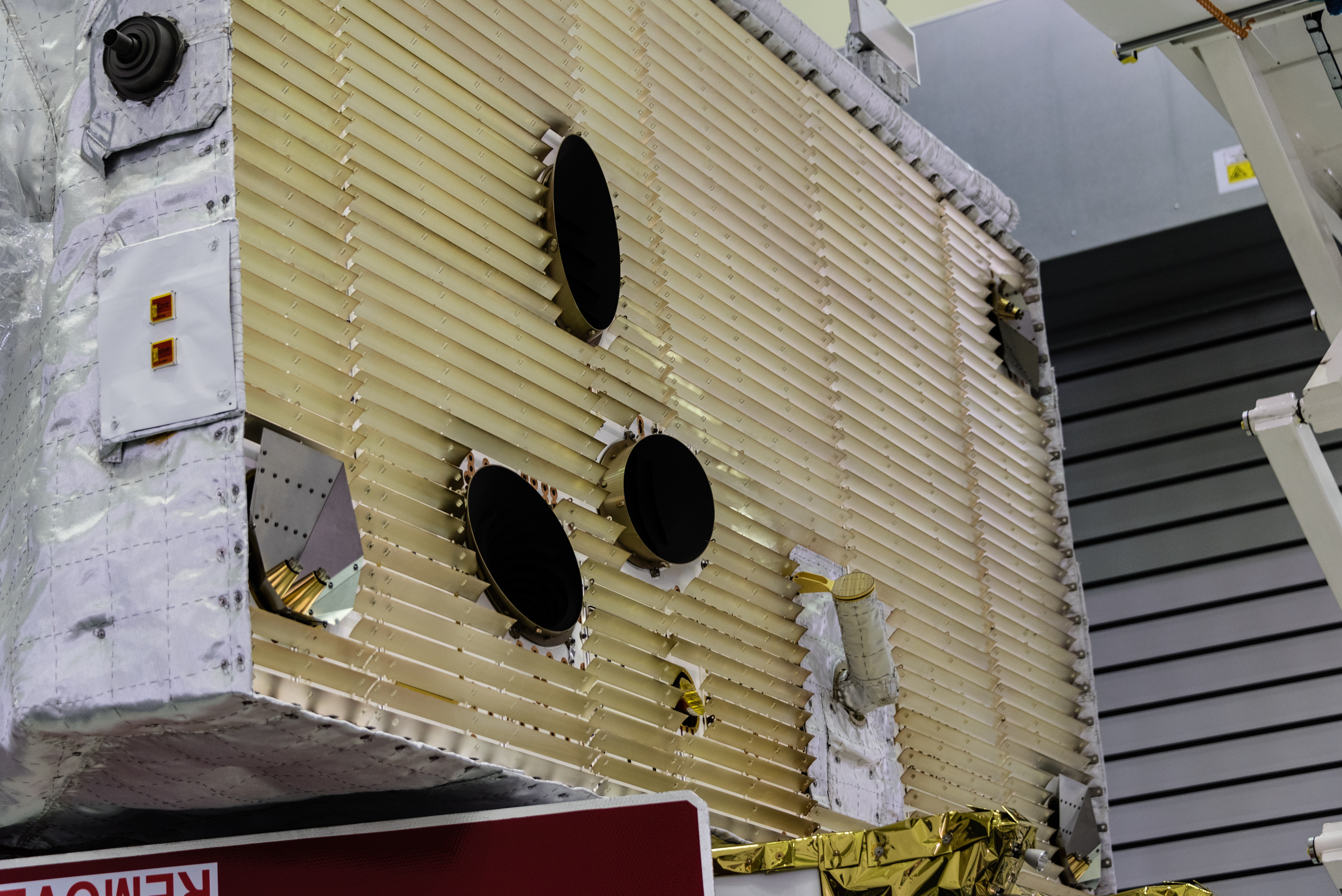
MPO radiator panel and instruments

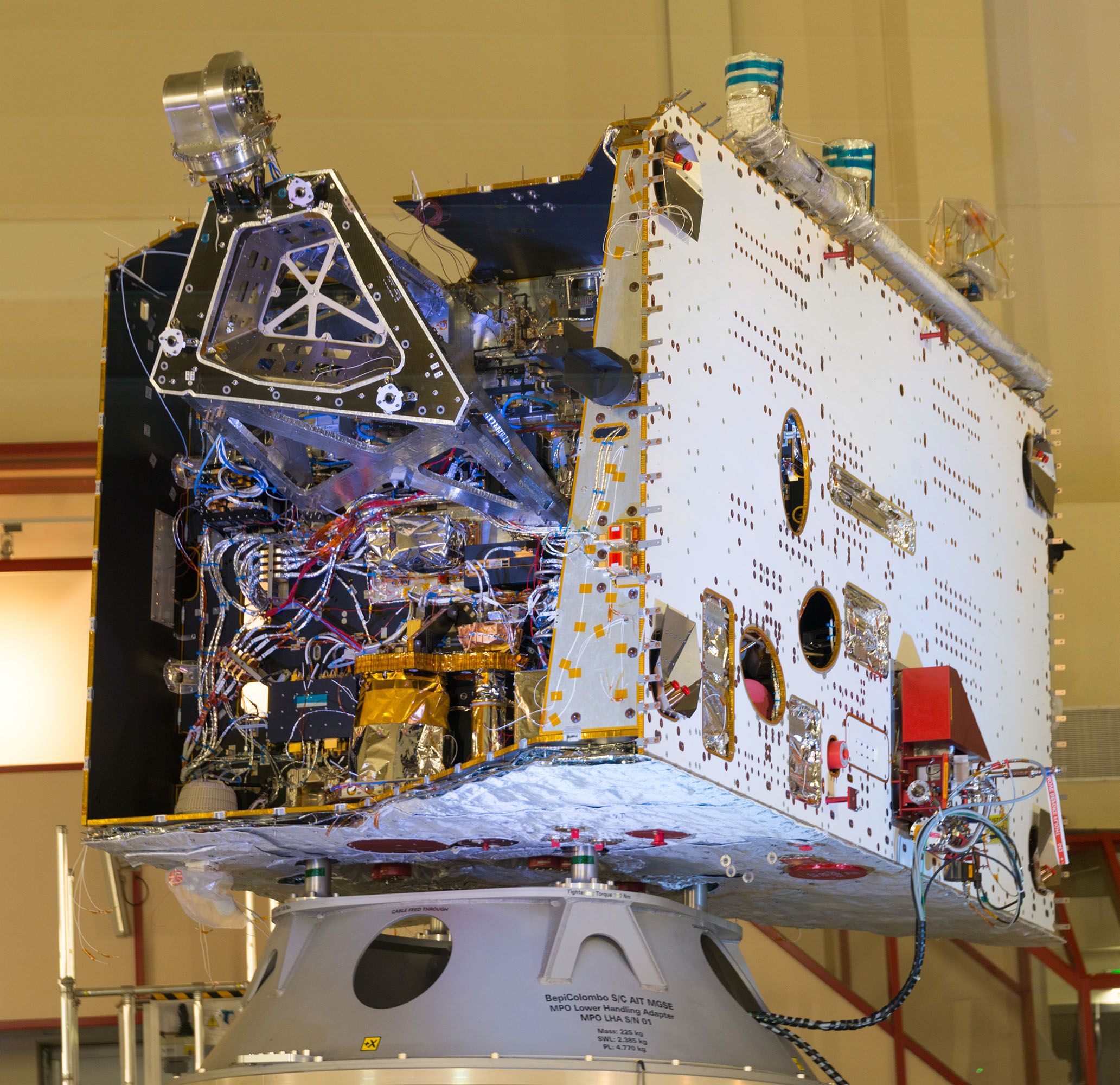
MPO at ESTEC before stacking

==== Science payload of MPO ====
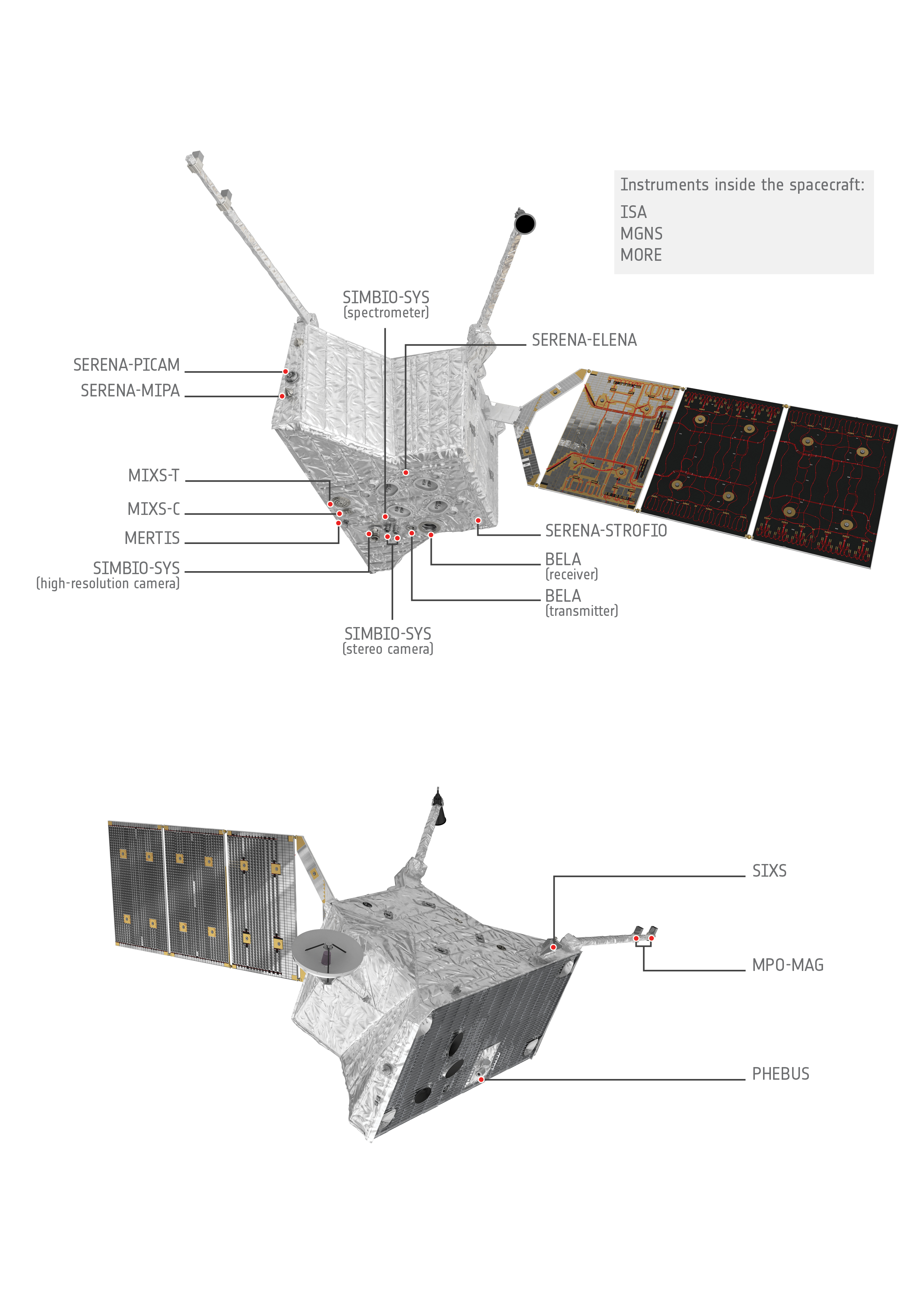
MPO's science instruments

The science payload of the Mercury Planetary Orbiter consists of eleven instruments:

- BepiColombo Laser Altimeter (BELA), developed by DLR in cooperation with the University of Bern, the Max Planck Institute for Solar System Research (MPS) and the Instituto de Astrofísica de Andalucía.
- Italian Spring Accelerometer (ISA), developed by Italy
- Mercury Magnetometer (MPO-MAG, MERMAG), developed by Germany and United Kingdom
- Mercury Radiometer and Thermal Infrared Spectrometer (MERTIS), developed by Germany
- Mercury Gamma-ray and Neutron Spectrometer (MGNS), developed by Russia
- Mercury Imaging X-ray Spectrometer (MIXS), developed and built by the University of Leicester, the Max Planck Institute for Solar System Research (MPS) and the Max Planck Institute for Extraterrestrial Physics (MPE).
- Mercury Orbiter Radio-science Experiment (MORE), developed by Italy and the United States
- Probing of Hermean Exosphere by Ultraviolet Spectroscopy (PHEBUS), developed by France and Russia
- Search for Exosphere Refilling and Emitted Neutral Abundances (SERENA), made up of 2 neutral and 2 ionised particle analysers:
  - ELENA (Emitted Low-Energy Neutral Atoms) developed by Italy;
  - STROFIO (STart from a ROtating Field mass spectrOmeter) developed by United States;
  - MIPA (Miniature Ion Precipitation Analyser) developed by Sweden;
  - PICAM (Planetary Ion CAMera) developed by the Space Research Institute (Institut für Weltraumforschung, IWF), Russian Space Research Institute (IKI), Institut de recherche en sciences de l'environnement (CETP/IPSL), European Space Research and Technology Centre (ESTEC), Research Institute for Particle and Nuclear Physics (KFKI-RMKI) and the Max Planck Institute for Solar System Research (MPS).
- Spectrometers and imagers for MPO BepiColombo Integrated Observatory System (SIMBIO-SYS), high resolution stereo cameras and a visual and near infrared spectrometer, developed by Italy, France and Switzerland
- Solar Intensity X-ray and Particle Spectrometer (SIXS), developed by Finland and United Kingdom.

=== Mio (Mercury Magnetospheric Orbiter) ===
Mio, or the Mercury Magnetospheric Orbiter (MMO), developed and built mostly by Japan, has the shape of a short octagonal prism, 180 cm (71 in) long from face to face and 90 cm (35 in) high. It has a mass of 285 kg (628 lb), including a 45 kg (99 lb) scientific payload consisting of 5 instrument groups, 4 for plasma and dust measuring run by investigators from Japan, and one magnetometer from Austria.

Mio will be spin stabilized at 15 rpm with the spin axis perpendicular to the equator of Mercury. It will enter a polar orbit at an altitude of 590 × 11,640 km (370 × 7,230 mi), outside of MPO's orbit. The top and bottom of the octagon act as radiators with louvers for active temperature control. The sides are covered with solar cells which provide 90 watts. Communications with Earth will be through a 0.8 m (2 ft 7 in) diameter X-band phased array high-gain antenna and two medium-gain antennas operating in the X-band. Telemetry will return 160 Gb/year, about 5 kbit/s over the lifetime of the spacecraft, which is expected to be greater than one year. The reaction and control system is based on cold gas thrusters. After its release in Mercury orbit, Mio will be operated by Sagamihara Space Operation Center using Usuda Deep Space Center's 64 m (210 ft) antenna located in Nagano, Japan.

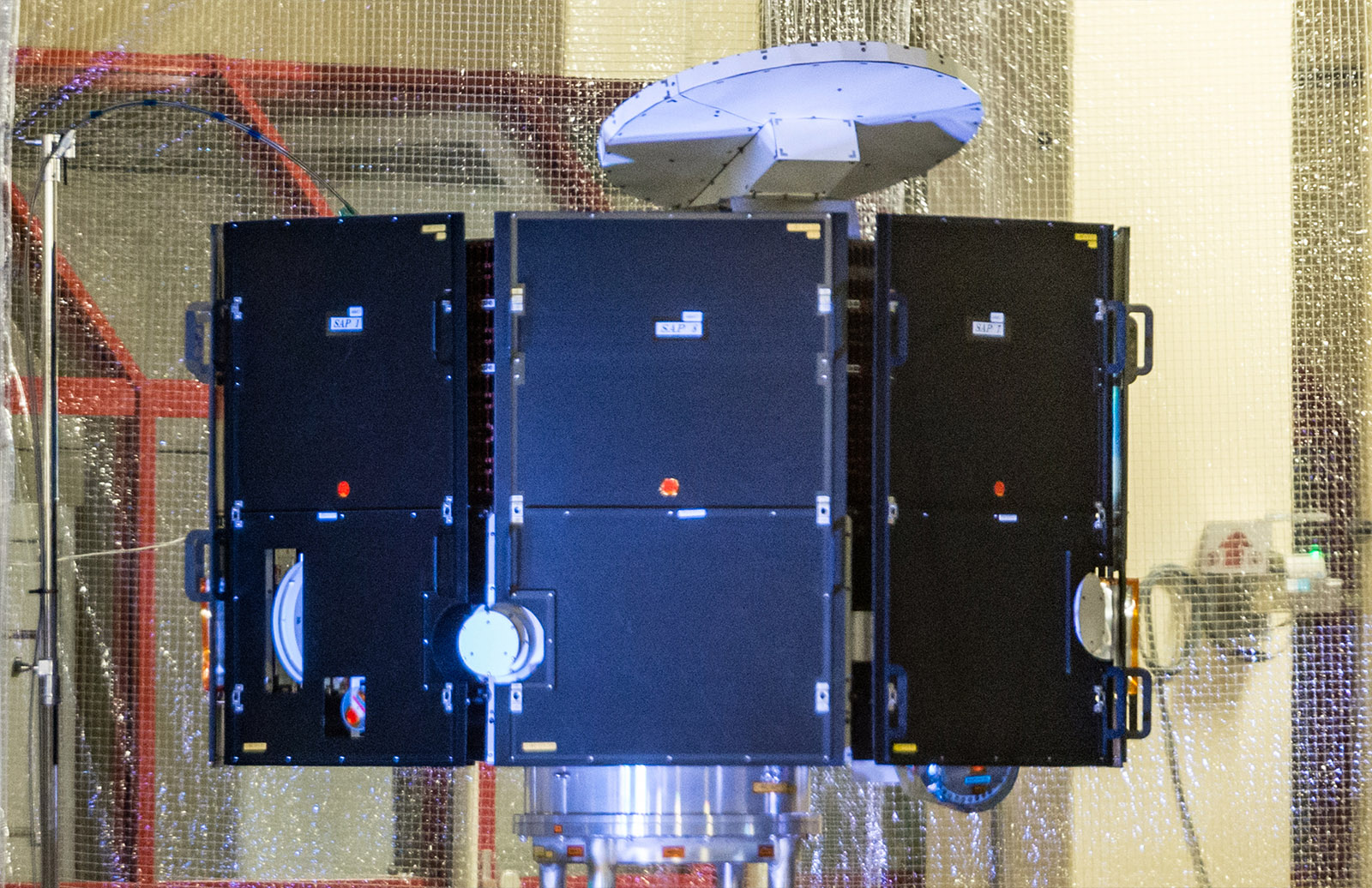
Mio at ESTEC before stacking

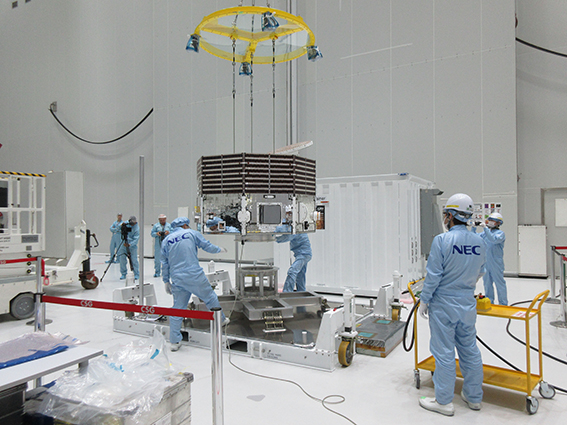
Mio being lifted from the container by a crane

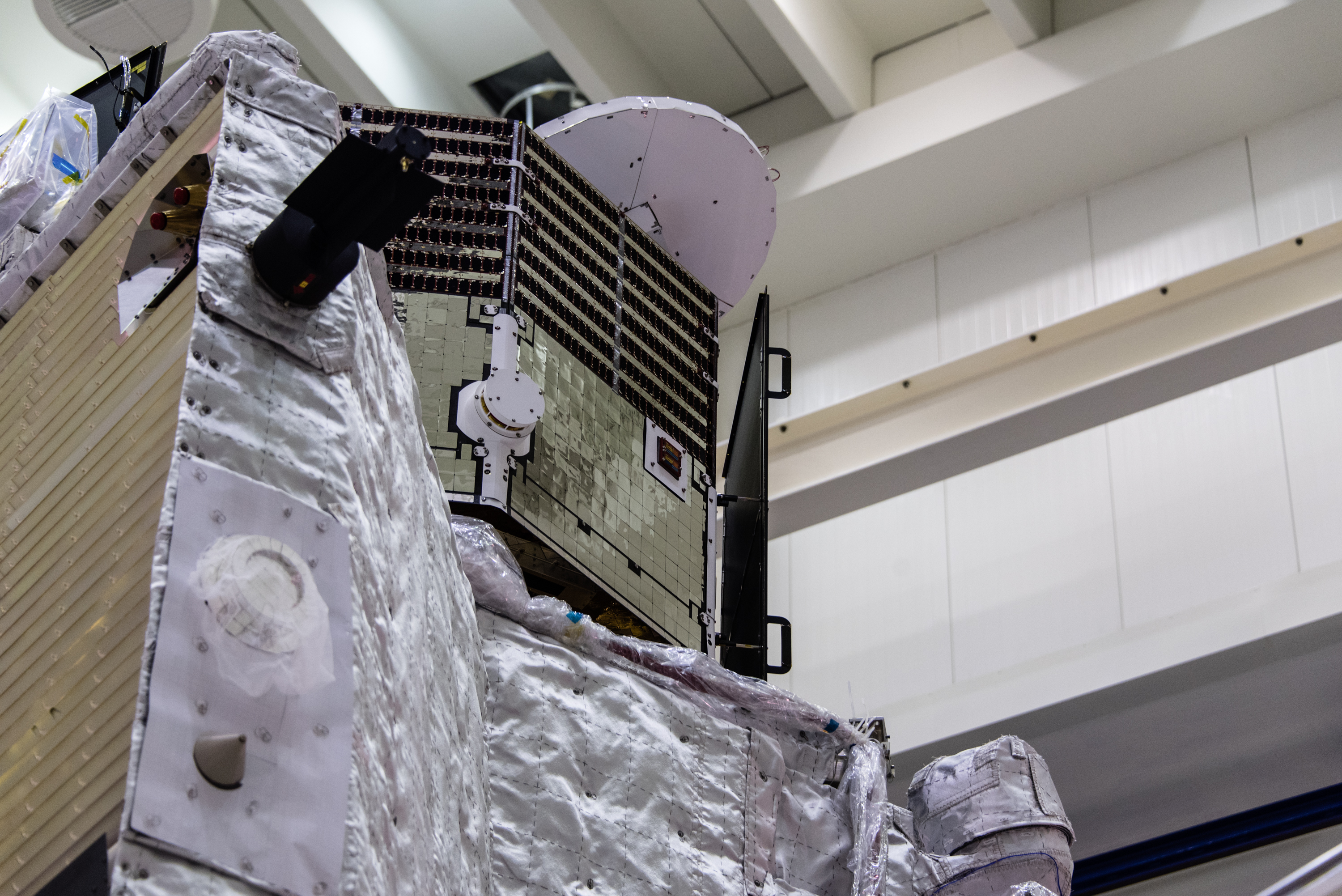
Mio on top of MPO (without sunshield)

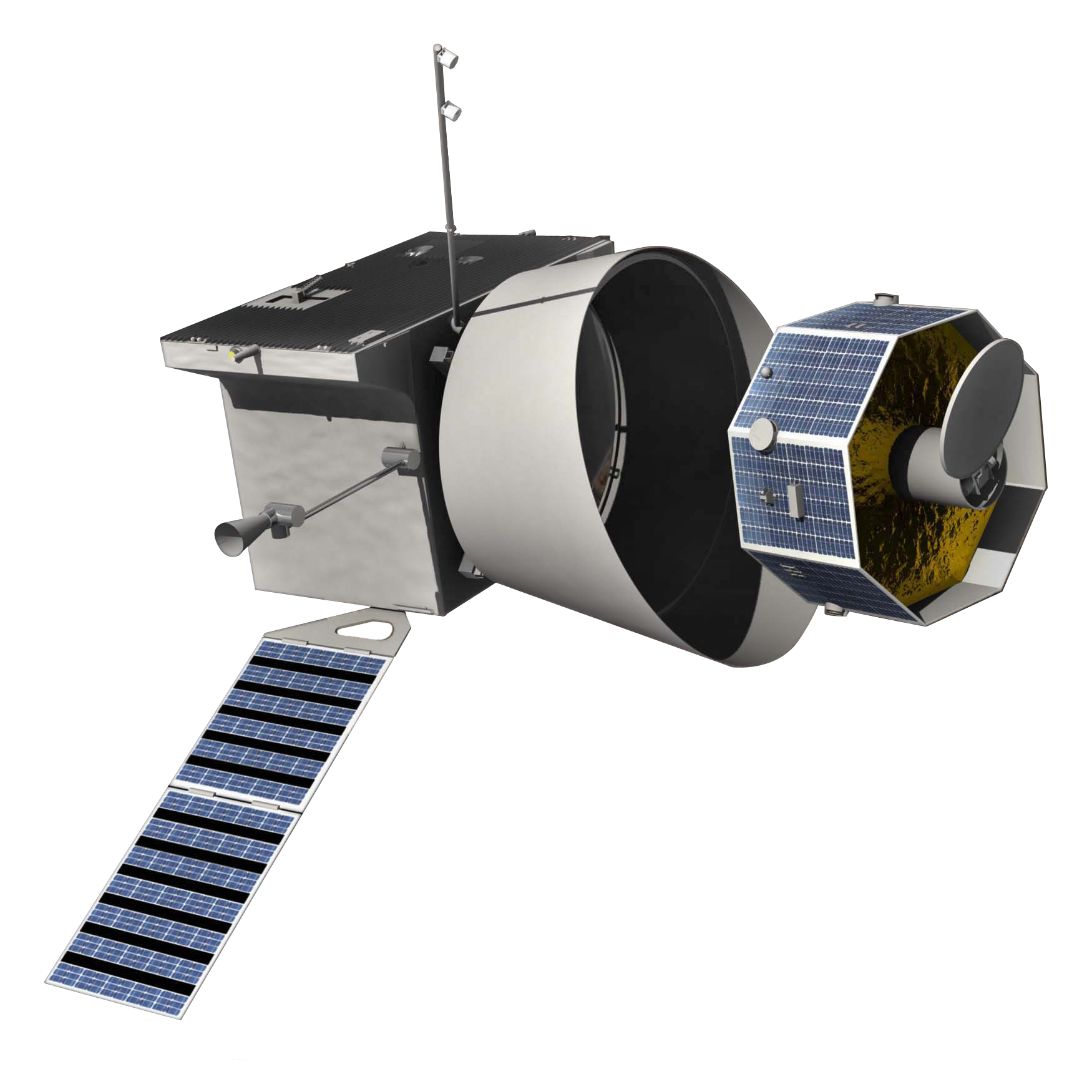
Deployment of Mio

==== Science payload of Mio ====
Mio carries five groups of science instruments with a total mass of 45 kg (99 lb):

- Mercury Plasma Particle Experiment (MPPE), studies the plasma and neutral particles from the planet, its magnetosphere, and the solar wind. It will employ these instruments:
  - Mercury Electron Analyzers (MEA1 and MEA2).
  - Mercury Ion Analyzer (MIA).
  - Mass Spectrum Analyzer (MSA), developed by Laboratory of Plasma Physics (LPP), Max Planck Institute for Solar System Research (MPS), IDA of Technical University of Braunschweig and Institute of Space and Astronautical Science (ISAS).
  - High-Energy Particle instrument for electrons (HEP-ele).
  - High-Energy Particle instrument for Ions (HEP-ion).
  - Energetic Neutrals Analyzer (ENA).
- Mercury Magnetometer (MMO-MGF), studies Mercury's magnetic field, magnetosphere, and interplanetary solar wind
- Plasma Wave Investigation (PWI), studies the electric field, electromagnetic waves, and radio waves from the magnetosphere and solar wind. The PWI consists of three receivers: EWO, SORBET and AM^{2}P, two sets of electric field sensors: MEFISTO and WPT and two sets of magnetic field sensors: LF-SC and DB-SC.
  - Mercury Electric Field In-Situ Tool (MEFISTO): Two sets of wire antenna, 15 m in length (32 m tip-to-tip length) with a preamp and deployment unit and control electronics. It will measure electric fields in the range from DC to around 3 MHz.
  - Wire-Probe Antenna (WPT): Two sets of wire antenna, 15 m in length (32 m tip-to-tip length) with a deployment unit and control electronics. It will measure electric fields in the range from DC to around 10 MHz.
  - Low Frequency Search Coils (LF-SC): To measure magnetic field in the range of 0.1 Hz to 20 kHz.
  - Dual-Band Search Coil (DB-SC): To measure magnetic field in two bands with a lower band in the range of 0.1 Hz to 20 kHz and an upper band in the range of 10 to 640 kHz.
  - EWO (EFD [Electric Field Detector], WFC [Waveform Capture] and OFA [Onboard Frequency Analyser]): EFD is a low-frequency electric field receiver (DC to 32 Hz), WFC/OFA-E is a medium frequency electric field receiver (10 Hz-20/120 kHz) and WFC/OFA-B is a medium frequency magnetic field receiver (0.1 Hz-20 kHz).
  - SORBET (Spectroscopic Ondes Radio & Bruit Electrostatique Thermique): A high frequency electric and magnetic field receiver (2.5 kHz-10 MHz in electric field and 10-640 kHz in magnetic field) along with thermal noise spectroscopy.
  - AM^{2}P (Active Measurement of Mercury's Plasma): Used for antenna impedance measurement and calibration signal source.
- Mercury Sodium Atmosphere Spectral Imager (MSASI), studies the thin sodium atmosphere of Mercury.
- Mercury Dust Monitor (MDM), studies dust from the planet and interplanetary space.

=== Magnetospheric Orbiter Sunshield and Interface ===
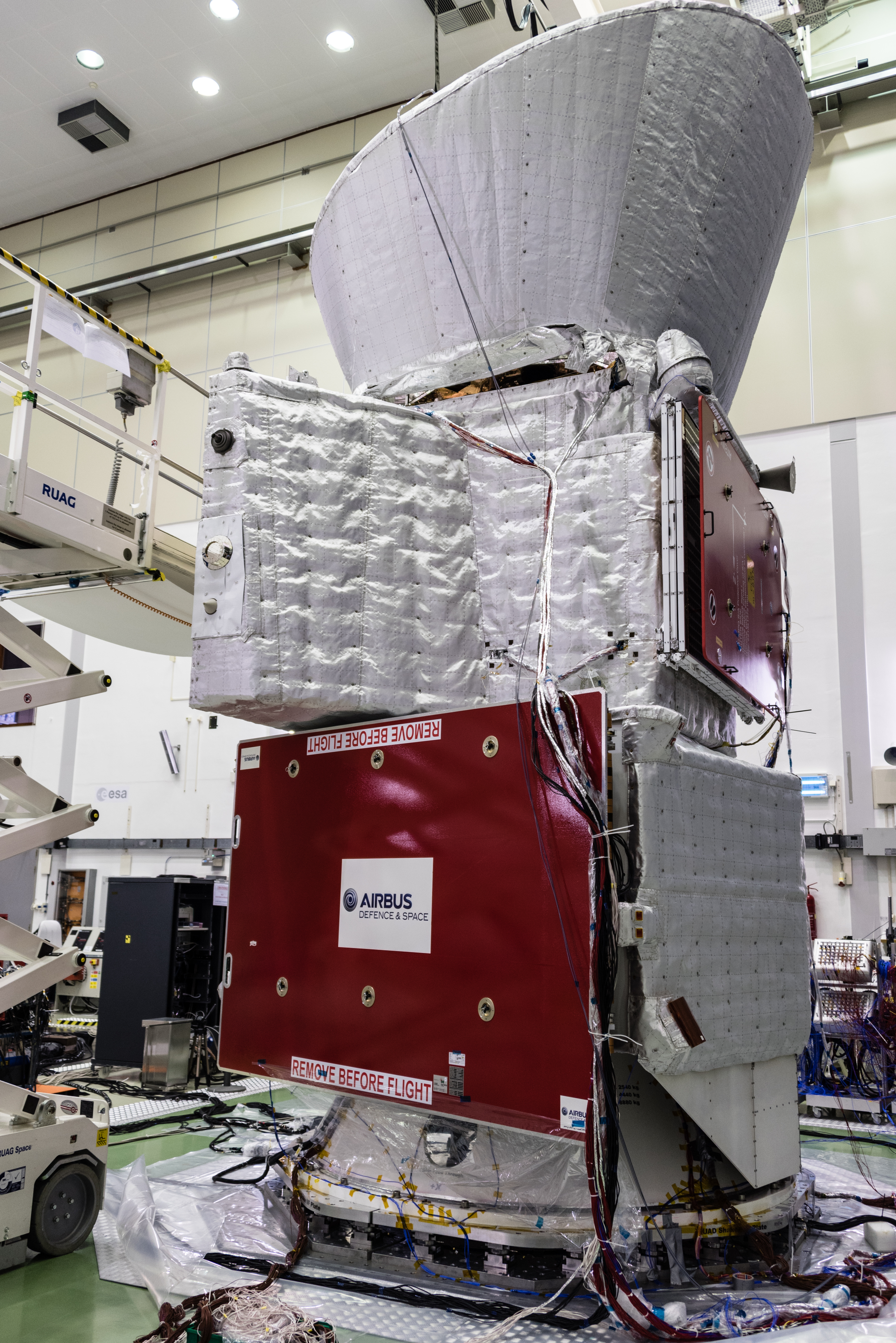
Full stack with sunshield on top

The Mio orbiter requires additional thermal control on the cruise to Mercury, in addition to umbilicals to the MPO. The European Space Agency thus provided the Magnetospheric Orbiter Sunshield and Interface (MOSIF), a white shroud that is shaped like a conical frustrum to provide clearance, as Mio is spun up during its separation in 2026, before being ejected from the MPO.

=== Mercury Surface Element (cancelled) ===
The Mercury Surface Element (MSE) was cancelled in 2003 due to budgetary constraints. At the time of cancellation, MSE was meant to be a small, 44 kg (97 lb), lander designed to operate for about one week on the surface of Mercury. Shaped as a 0.9 m (2 ft 11 in) diameter disc, it was designed to land at a latitude of 85° near the terminator region. Braking manoeuvres would bring the lander to zero velocity at an altitude of 120 m (390 ft) at which point the propulsion unit would be ejected, airbags inflated, and the module would fall to the surface with a maximum impact velocity of 30 m/s (98 ft/s). Scientific data would be stored onboard and relayed via a cross-dipole UHF antenna to either the MPO or Mio. The MSE would have carried a 7 kg (15 lb) payload consisting of an imaging system (a descent camera and a surface camera), a heat flow and physical properties package, an alpha particle X-ray spectrometer, a magnetometer, a seismometer, a soil penetrating device (mole), and a micro-rover.

== See also ==
- List of European Space Agency programmes and missions
- Exploration of Mercury
- MESSENGER – the first spacecraft to orbit Mercury
