= Ariane flight VA245 =

Space launch

- Official poster for the flight

Ariane 5 ECA launch
- Launch: 20 October 2018, 01:45:28 UTC
- Operator: Arianespace
- Pad: Kourou ELA-3
- Payload: Mio; MPO; MTM
- Outcome: Success

Components
- Serial no.: 5105

Ariane launches

Ariane Flight VA245 is the Ariane 5 space launch of BepiColombo that took place on 20 October 2018 at 01:45:28 UTC from the Guiana Space Centre. It was the 101st launch of Ariane 5 (the 5th in 2018), and the 301st Arianespace mission (the 7th in 2018).

== Payload ==
The payload of the launcher was the BepiColombo spacecraft. The total payload mass was approximately 4,241 kilograms (9,350 lb), including the payload adapter.

=== BepiColombo ===
BepiColombo had a liftoff mass of approximately 4,081 kilograms (8,997 lb). It comprises 3 different elements that will remain attached together during launch and cruise to Mercury: the Mercury Transfer Module (MTM), the Mercury Planetary Orbiter (MPO), and the Mercury Magnetospheric Orbiter (Mio or MMO). The assembly was accommodated inside the long version of the upper stage fairing. BepiColombo, a joint mission between ESA and JAXA, is Europe's first space mission to Mercury. The European modules (MTM and MPO) were designed and manufactured by Airbus at its Friedrichshafen site in Germany as prime contractor for ESA, heading a consortium of 83 companies from 16 countries. The Japanese module (Mio) was built by ISAS for JAXA. This flight was Airbus's 121st mission, ESA's 51st mission and 73rd spacecraft launched by Arianespace, and the latter's 23rd deep space mission.

== Mission overview ==
=== Launch date ===
The 7th Arianespace launch of 2018 took place on 20 October 2018 at 01:45:28 UTC (19 October 2018 22:45:28 local time) from Ariane Launch Complex No. 3 (ELA 3) in Kourou, French Guiana.

=== Pre-flight activities ===
The different parts of the spacecraft arrived in French Guiana between April 24 and May 9. Deployment testing of BepiColombo's MTM 2 solar arrays (which will generate up to 11.2 kW of power) were performed at the Guiana Space Centre in the SC5 facilities. The MMO was integrated on the MPO between August 20 and 21. They were both integrated on the MTM between September 19 and 20 to complete BepiColombo. BepiColombo was assembled with its payload adapter on October 4, integrated on the launch vehicle on October 9, and enclosed within the fairing on October 11. The launch readiness review took place on 17 October 2018 in Kourou to authorise the start of the final operations.

=== Orbit ===
The launch lasted 26 minutes and 47 seconds until separation, placing BepiColombo into a Mercury transfer orbit, escaping the Earth with a hyperbolic escape velocity of about 3.475 kilometres per second (2.159 mi/s) and at an inclination of about -3.8 degrees. It is expected to be captured by and start orbiting Mercury approximately on 5 December 2025, after a 7-year travel that will include several flybys of the Earth, Venus, and Mercury itself.
