= Northolt Branch Observatories =

- Northolt Branch Observatories logo
- Alternative names: NBO
- Observatory code: Z80, Z48, Z37
- Location: London, England; Blandford Forum, England; Marburg, Germany
- Coordinates: 51.55466°N 0.37192°W
- Altitude: 55 metres (180 ft)
- Established: September 27, 2015
- Website: www.facebook.com/NBObservatories

Telescopes
- 0.25-metre f/8 Ritchey–Chrétien
- 0.07-metre f/5.9 refractor
- 0.30-metre f/8 Ritchey–Chrétien
- 0.15-metre f/10 Schmidt-Cassegrain
- Location of Northolt Branch Observatories

The Northolt Branch Observatories is an astronomical observatory located in London, England. NBO collects follow-up astrometry of near-Earth asteroids and other small Solar System objects.

== Formation and membership ==
Northolt Branch Observatories was founded in 2015, as an extension of the London-based Northolt Branch Astro group of local amateur astrophotographers. It is a British-German collaboration: Data is collected on-site by observers at the telescopes in England, and then processed remotely from Germany.

Chris Lintott described them as "amongst the sharpest players of this game" of NEO spotting, pointing out that their location in West London suffers from so much light pollution that it "could lay serious claim to being the place with the worst possible conditions from which to observe the sky".

== Discoveries and false alarms ==
The two main belt asteroids 72834 Guywells and 128345 Danielbamberger are named after members of the Northolt Branch Observatories team.

One of their observations was designated 2020 GL2 by the Minor Planet Center in its catalogue. Observed by NBO between 2020-04-10 and 2020-04-12 and reported by them, it was retrospectively discovered in earlier images from other telescopes in California and Hawai'i, but later formally retracted by the MPC from the catalogue, a rare event, when it was determined to be ESA's BepiColombo. Their images of BepiColombo from those nights went on later the same month to win an informal ESA competition for the "best track" of the spacecraft.
