= Agwo Facula =

Facula on Mercury

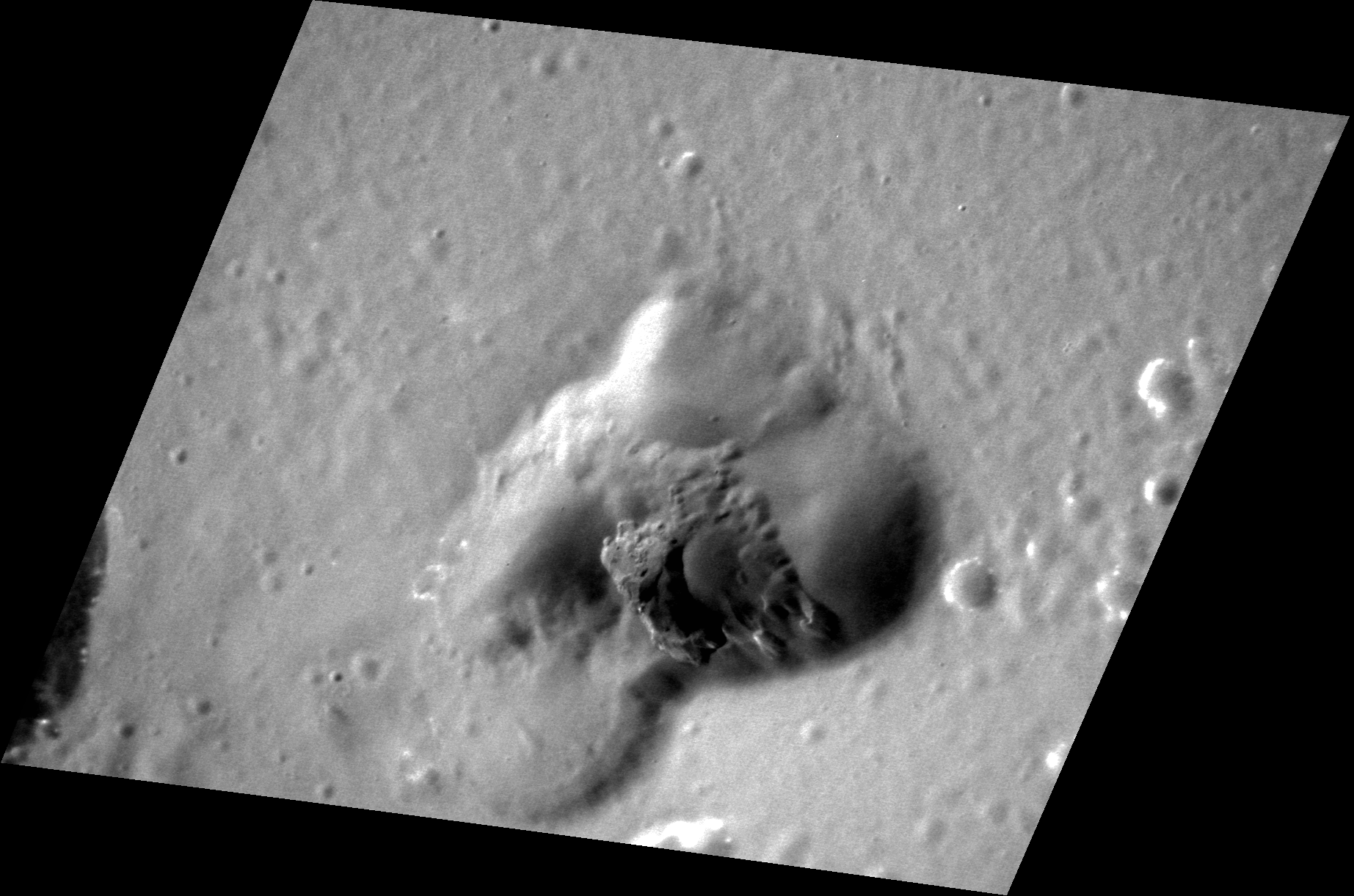
Agwo Facula. Map-projected MESSENGER NAC image.

Agwo Facula is a bright, irregular depression on the surface of Mercury, located at 22.4° N, 213.7° W, in southwestern Caloris Planitia. It was named by the IAU in 2018. Agwo is the Igbo word for snake. The depression is the site of multiple volcanic explosions.

Agwo Facula is near the southwestern rim of the Caloris basin. Agwo Facula is immediately northeast of Abeeso Facula.

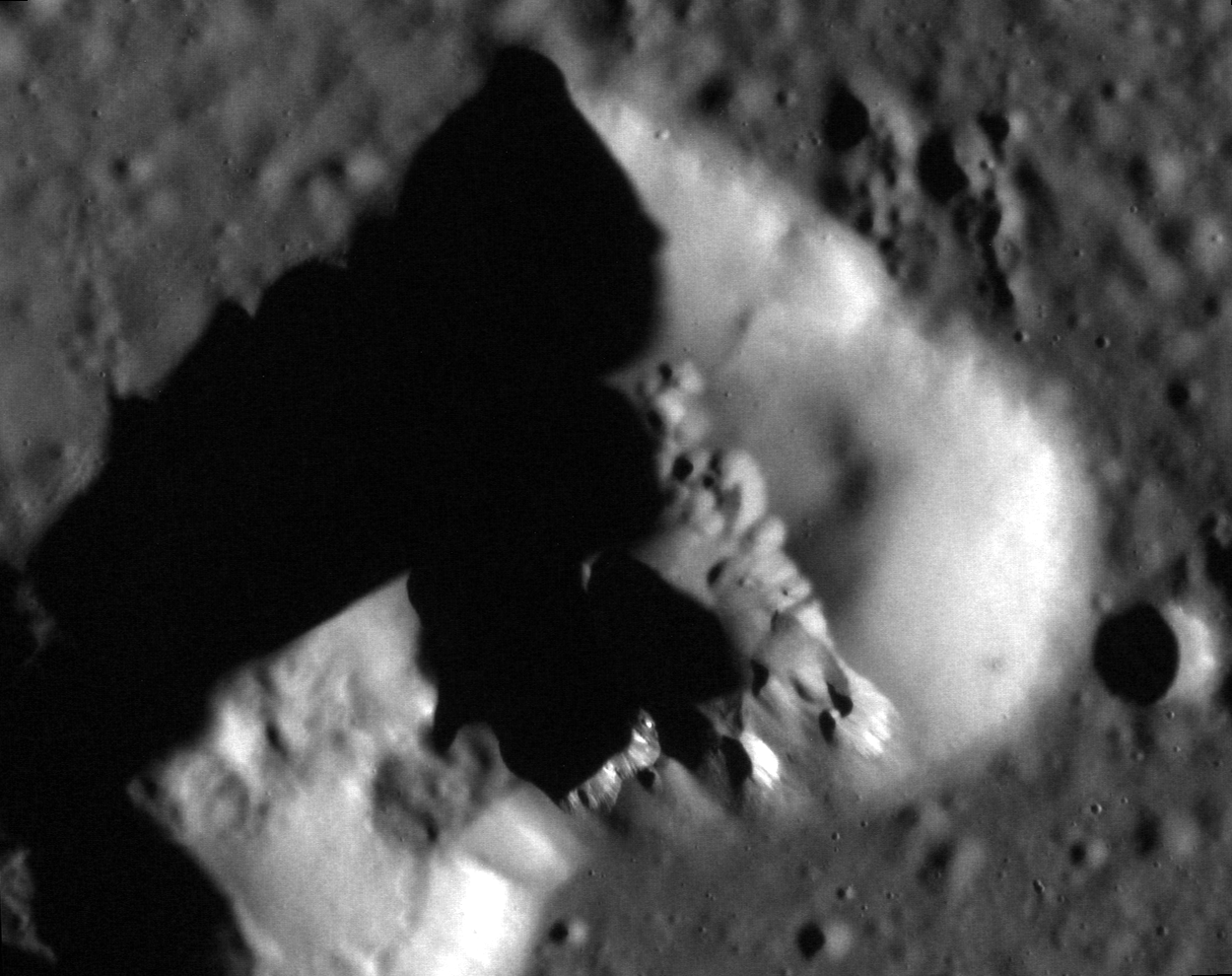
A close-up at low sun angle

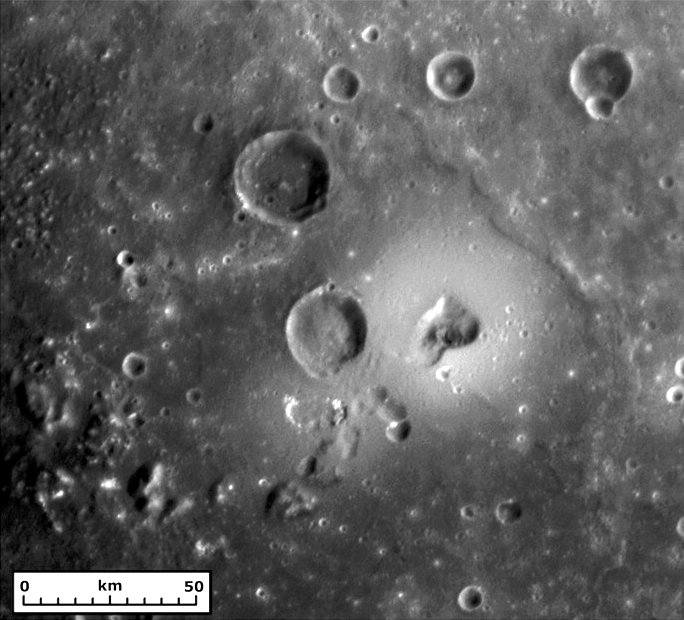
Map showing Agwo Facula and nearby Abeeso Facula

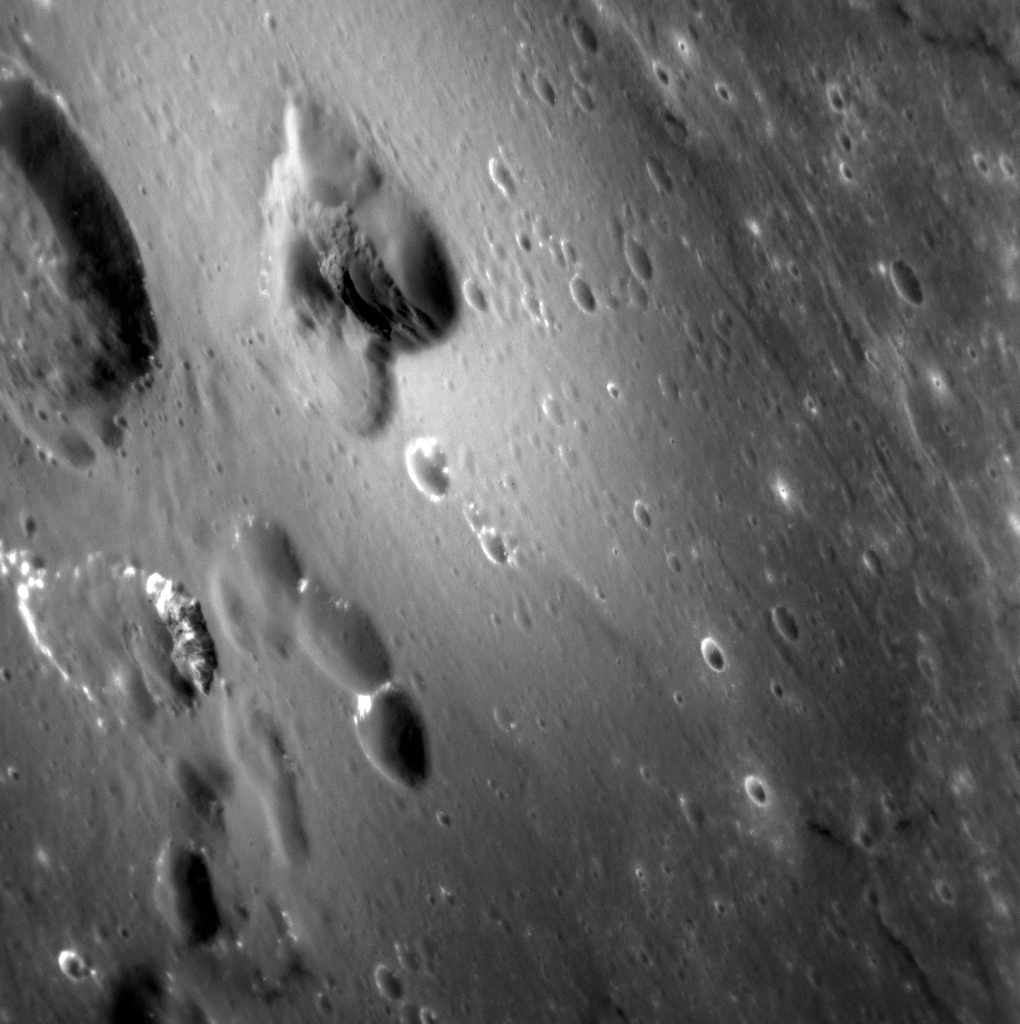
Another view from MESSENGER
