= Skinakas (hypothetical basin) =

Structure on Mercury

- Location: Mercury
- Coordinates: 8°N 280°W
- Diameter: 2300 km
- Eponym: Skinakas observatory

The Skinakas basin is the informal name given to a structure on Mercury that appeared to be an extremely large impact basin. The limited-resolution Mariner 10 images available showed a double-ringed structure, with the inner ring having a diameter of around 1600 km, which would have made it one of the largest impact basins in the Solar System. It appeared to be even larger than the Caloris basin on Mercury, which has been known since the Mariner 10 flybys of that planet. The part of the outer ring that was imaged appeared to correspond to a diameter of around 2300 km.

The basin was supposedly centered at about 8°N 80°E and lay on the hemisphere of Mercury that was not imaged by Mariner 10. This place is situated near an albedo feature Solitudo Aphrodites (25°N 70°E). In 2001, it was observed and imaged by ALPO (Association of Lunar and Planetary Observers) members. But it was followed by L. Ksanfomality from lucky imaging observations in 2004. The informal name is after the Skinakas observatory on Crete where the observations were taken. Despite radar images having a far greater resolution they are not useful for detecting very large impact basins such as this one; for example, the Caloris basin is also not visible in radar. However, careful examination of images by MESSENGER spacecraft showed no evidence of the Skinakas basin.
