= Abeeso Facula =

Facula on Mercury

Abeeso Facula is a bright, irregular depression on the surface of Mercury, located at 21.7° N, 214.6° W, in southwestern Caloris Planitia. It was named by the IAU in 2018. Abeeso is the Somali word for snake. The depression is the site of a volcanic explosion.

Abeeso Facula is near the southwestern rim of the Caloris basin. Abeeso Facula is immediately southwest of Agwo Facula.

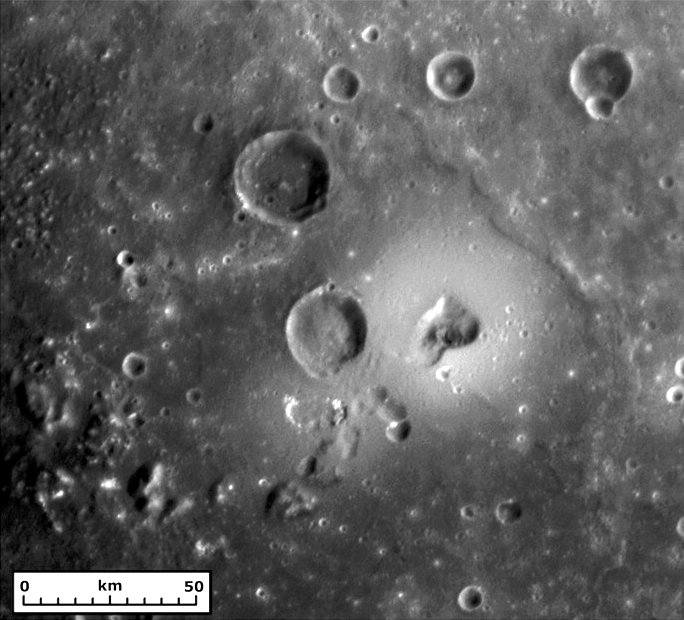
Map showing Abeeso Facula and nearby Agwo Facula

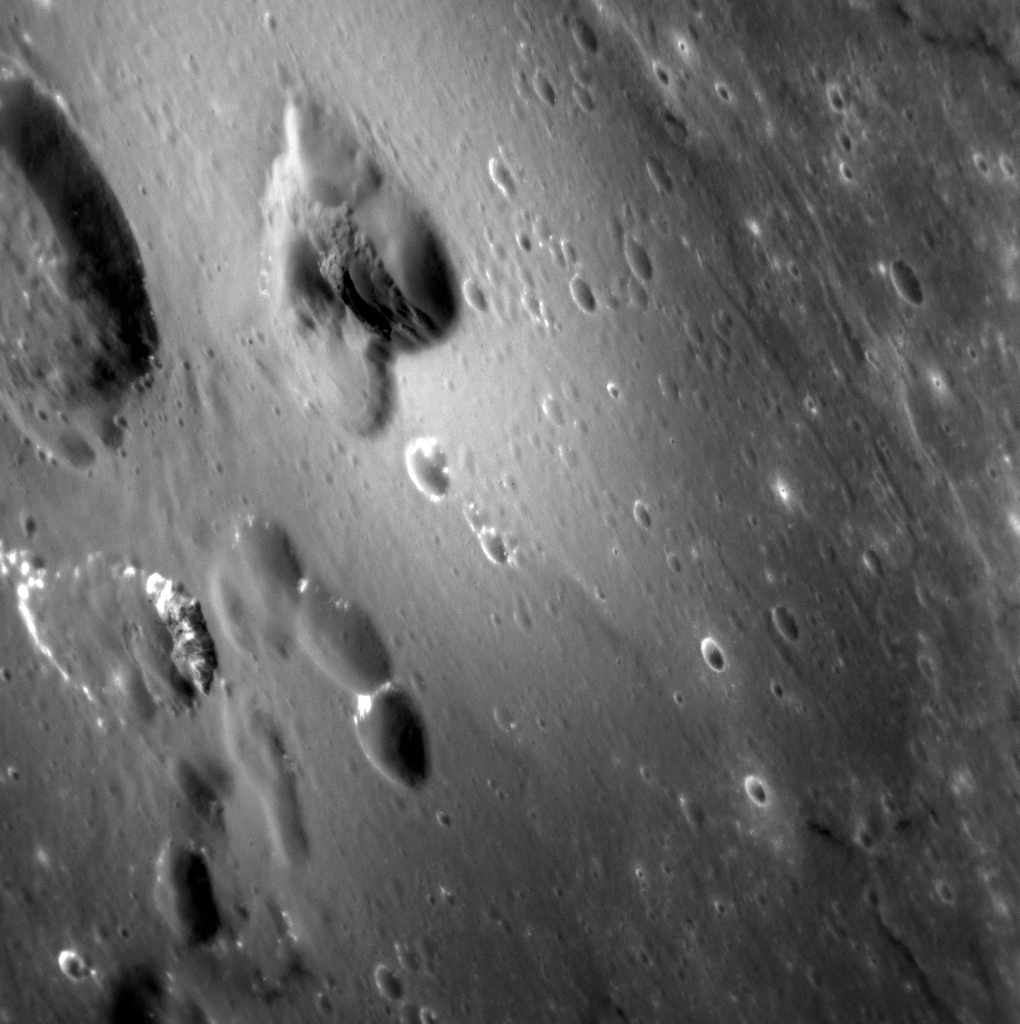
Another view from MESSENGER
