= Eugène Atget =

French photographer (1857–1927)

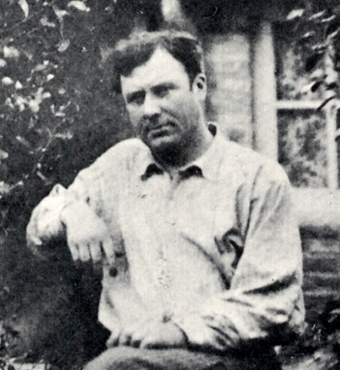
- Atget, c. 1890
- Born: Jean-Eugène-Auguste Atget; 12 February 1857; Libourne, Gironde, Aquitaine, France
- Died: 4 August 1927 (aged 70); Paris, France
- Occupation: Photographer
- Spouse: Valentine Delafosse Compagnon

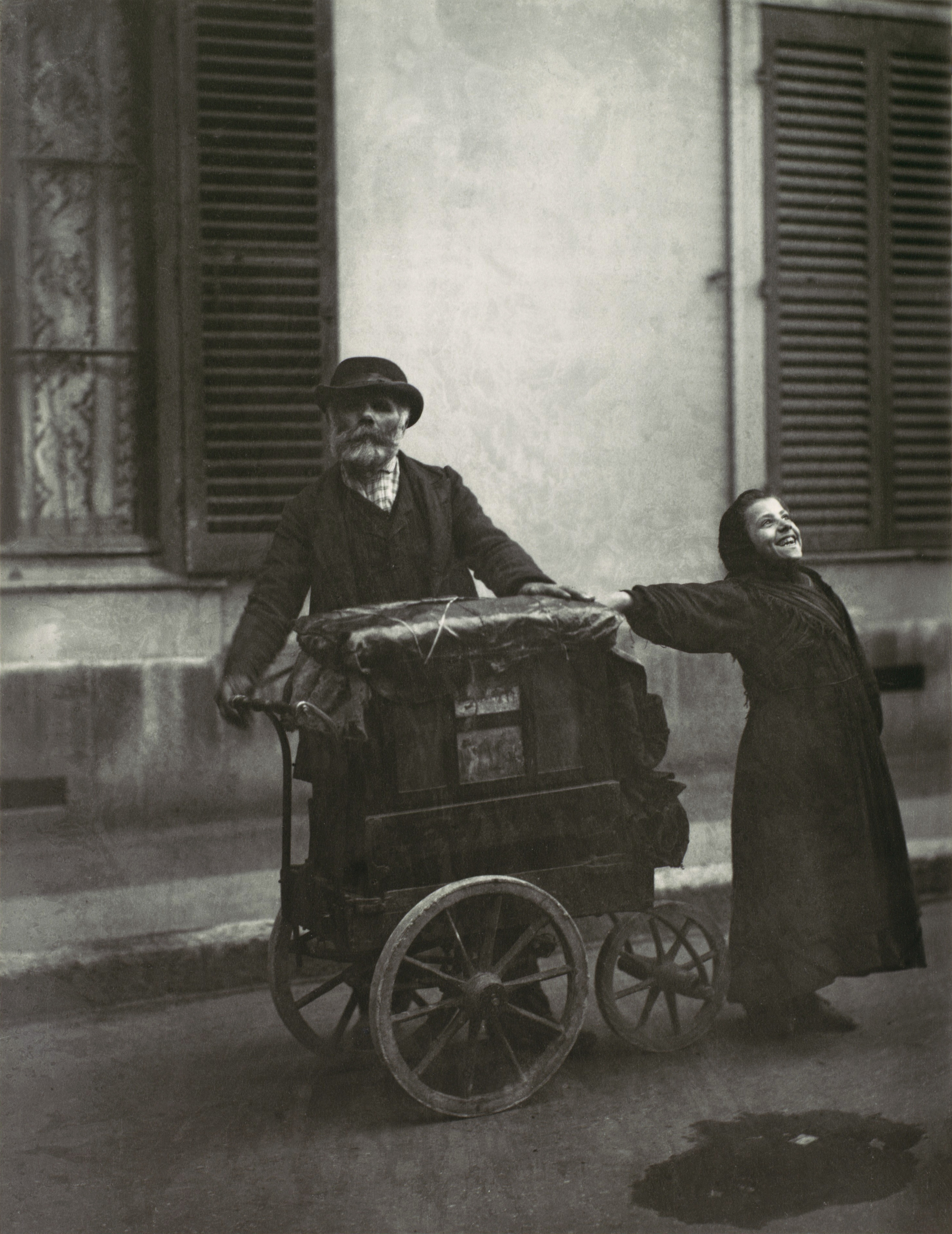
Organ Grinder (1898)

Eugène Atget (French: [adʒɛ]; 12 February 1857 – 4 August 1927) was a French flâneur and a pioneer of documentary photography, determined to document all of the architecture and street scenes of Paris before their disappearance to modernization. Most of his photographs were first published by Berenice Abbott after his death. Though he sold his work to artists and craftspeople, and became an inspiration for the surrealists, he did not live to see the wide acclaim his work would eventually receive.

== Biography ==
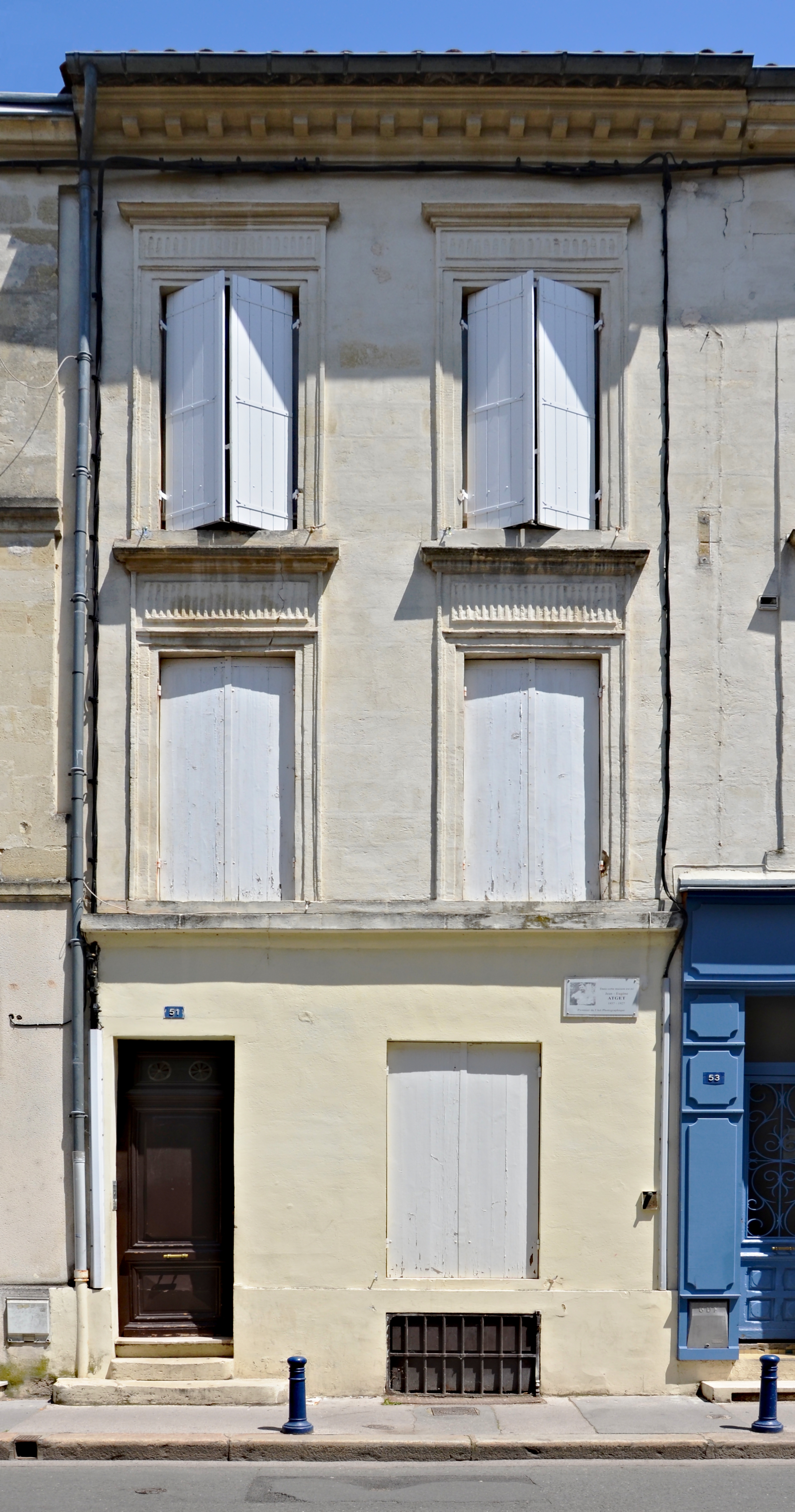
Atget's birthplace in Libourne

=== Early years ===
Jean-Eugène-Auguste Atget was born 12 February 1857 in Libourne. His father, carriage builder Jean-Eugène Atget, died in 1862, and his mother, Clara-Adeline Atget née Hourlier died shortly after; he was an orphan at age seven. He was brought up by his maternal grandparents in Bordeaux and, after finishing secondary education, joined the merchant navy.

=== Moving to Paris ===
Atget moved to Paris in 1878. He failed the entrance exam for the acting class but was admitted on his second try. Because he was drafted for military service, he could attend class only part-time, and he was expelled from drama school.

Still living in Paris, (Note: 12 Rue des Beaux-Arts) he became an actor with a travelling group, performing in the Paris suburbs and the provinces. He met actress Valentine Delafosse Compagnon, who became his companion until her death in 1926. He gave up acting because of an infection of his vocal cords in 1887, moved to the provinces and took up painting without success. When he was thirty, he made his first photographs, of Amiens and Beauvais, which date from 1888.

=== Photography and documents for artists ===
In 1890, Atget moved back to Paris (Note: 5 Rue de la Pitié) and became a professional photographer, supplying documents for artists: studies for painters, architects, and stage designers.

Starting in 1898, institutions such as the Musée Carnavalet and the Bibliothèque historique de la ville de Paris bought his photographs. The latter commissioned him ca. 1906 to systematically photograph old buildings in Paris. In 1899 he moved to Montparnasse. (Note: 17bis Rue Campagne-Première)

While still a photographer, Atget also called himself an actor, giving lectures and readings.

During World War I Atget temporarily stored his archives in his basement for safekeeping and almost completely gave up photography. Valentine's son Léon was killed at the front.

In 1920–21, he sold thousands of his negatives to institutions. Financially independent, he took up photographing the parks of Versailles, Saint-Cloud and Sceaux and produced a series of photographs of prostitutes.

=== Later years and creative heritage ===
Berenice Abbott, while working with Man Ray, visited Atget in 1925, bought some of his photographs, and tried to interest other artists in his work. She continued to promote Atget through various articles, exhibitions, and books, and sold her Atget collection to the Museum of Modern Art in 1968.

In 1926, Atget's partner Valentine died, and Atget himself died in Paris on 4 August 1927. — before he ever saw the full-face and profile portraits that Abbott took of him that same year, showing him "slightly stooped...tired, sad, remote, appealing".

=== Biographical myth ===
Few reliable facts about Atget's life are known. He is often described as poor, though some researchers regard his financial hardship as a myth invented later to cast him as a romantic artist. John Szarkowski cited a fragment of Atget's correspondence with Paul Léon—a professor at the Collège de France, an official of the Commission on Historical Monuments, and a senior figure in the French Ministry of Culture—showing that Atget sold 2,600 negatives for 10,000 francs. This was one of his largest lifetime sales, though not his only one.

== Photographic practice ==
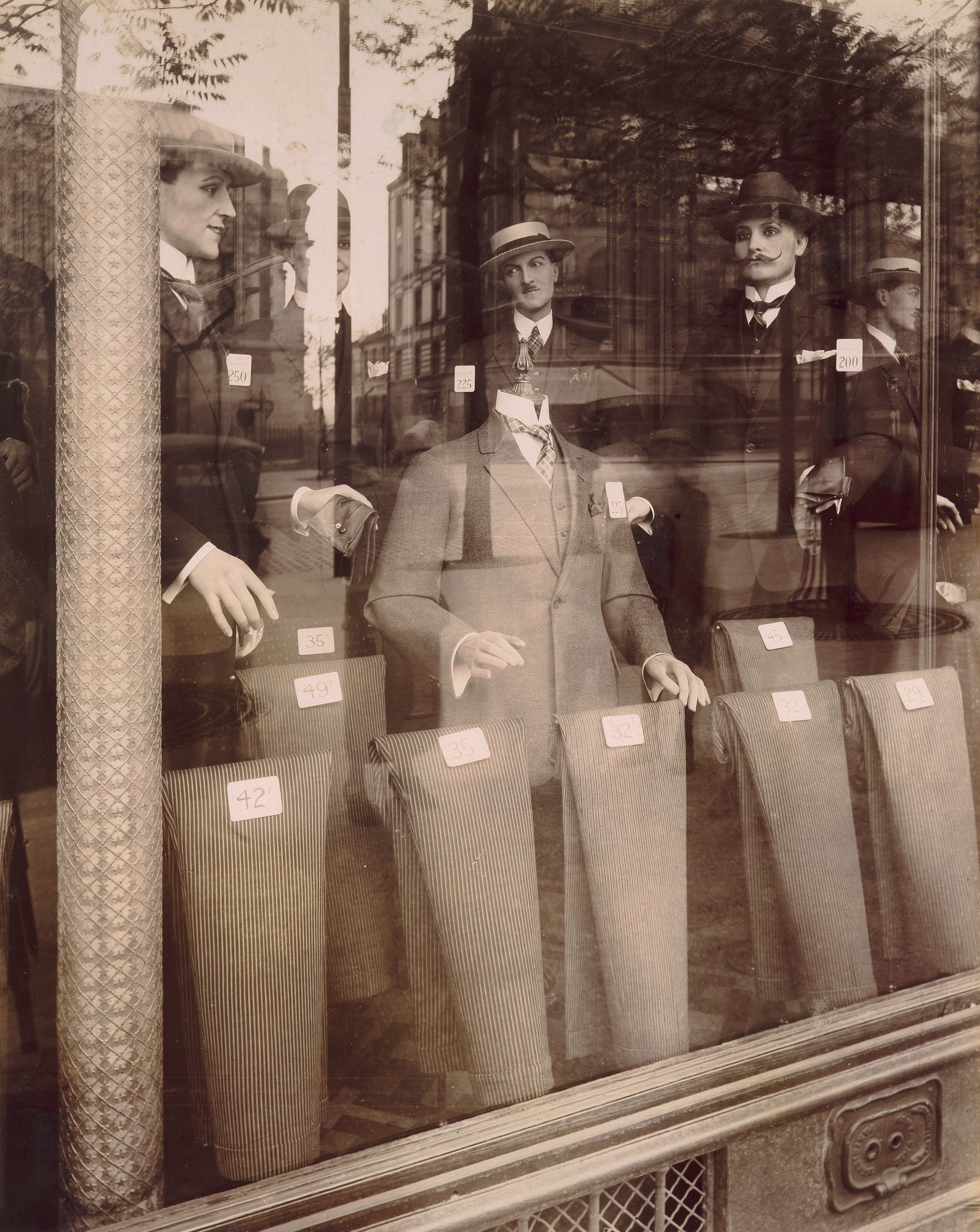
Avenue des Gobelins (1927)

=== The beginning of photography and photography of Paris ===
Atget took up photography in the late 1880s, around the time that photography was experiencing unprecedented expansion in both commercial and amateur fields.

Atget photographed Paris with a large-format wooden bellows camera with a rapid rectilinear lens, an instrument that was still current when he took it up, but which he continued to use even after hand-held, more efficient large-format cameras became available. The optical vignetting often seen at some corners of his photographs is due to his having repositioned the lens relative to the plate on the camera—exploiting one of the features of bellows view cameras as a way to control perspective and keep vertical forms straight. The negatives show four small clear rebates (printing black) where clips held the glass in the plate-holder during exposure. The glass plates were 180×240mm Bande Bleue (Blue Ribbon) brand with a general purpose gelatin-silver emulsion, fairly slow, that necessitated quite long exposures, resulting in the blurring of moving subjects seen in some of his pictures. Interest in Atget's work has prompted the recent scientific analysis of Atget's negatives and prints in Parisian collections and in the Philadelphia Museum of Art.

=== Specifics of the technique ===
In Intérieurs Parisiens, a series of photographs he took for the Bibliothèque Nationale, he included a view of his own simple darkroom with trays for processing negatives and prints, a safelight, and printing frames. After taking a photograph, Atget would develop, wash, and fix his negative, then assign it to one of his filing categories, writing the negative number in graphite on the verso and scratching it into the emulsion. He contact-printed his negatives onto pre-sensitized, commercially available printing-out papers; albumen paper, gelatin-silver printing-out paper, or two types of matte albumen paper that he used mainly after WW1. The negative was clamped into a printing frame under glass and against a sheet of albumen photographic printing out paper, which was left out in the sun to expose. The frame permitted inspection of the print until a satisfactory exposure was achieved, then Atget washed, fixed, and toned his print with gold toner, as was the standard practice when he took up photography.

Atget did not use an enlarger, and all of his prints are the same size as their negatives. Prints would be numbered and labelled on their backs in pencil, then inserted by the corners into four slits cut in each page of the albums. Additional albums were assembled based on specific themes that might interest his clients, and separately from series or chronology.

=== Features and specifics of photographic practice ===
A central question about Atget's work concerns the nature of his legacy. Some scholars regard him primarily as the author of romantic Parisian views. Others hold that the scale of the archive matters most in assessing his work—the corpus of some 10,000 photographs as a whole, rather than individual images. On this view, his work's significance rests on the arrangement of the images into a sequential series as much as on any single picture. The scale is central: the exceptional number of photographs (about 10,000) together with the systematic archival principle he applied. The idea of the corpus as a single work informed the landmark exhibition Maria Morris Hambourg and John Szarkowski prepared at MoMA, an approach also supported by Rosalind Krauss and others.

== Subject matter ==
By 1891, Atget advertised his business with a shingle at his door, later remarked on by Berenice Abbott that read "Documents pour Artistes". Initially his subjects were flowers, animals, landscapes, and monuments; sharp and meticulous studies centred simply in the frame and intended for artists' use.

Atget then embarked on a series of picturesque views of Paris which include documentation of the small trades in his series Petits Métiers. He made views of gardens in the areas surrounding Paris, in the summer of 1901, photographing the gardens at Versailles, a challenging subject of large scale and with combinations of natural and architectural and sculptural elements which he would revisit until 1927, learning to make balanced compositions and perspectives.

Early in the 1900s, Atget began to document "Old Paris," reading extensively to focus sympathetically on Paris architecture and environments dating to before the French Revolution, a concern for the preservation of which ensured him commercial success. He framed the winding streets to show the historic buildings in context, rather than making frontal architectural elevations.

Atget's specialisation in imagery of Old Paris expanded his clientele. Amongst his scant surviving documents was his notebook, known by the word Repertoire on its cover (the French repertoire meaning a thumb-indexed address book or directory, but also defined, aptly in actor Atget's case, as 'a stock of plays, dances, or items that a company or a performer knows or is prepared to perform'). The book is now in the MoMA collection, and in it he recorded the names and addresses of 460 clients; architects, interior decorators, builders and their artisans skilled in ironwork, wood panelling, door knockers, also painters, engravers, illustrators, and set designers, jewellers René Lalique and Weller, antiquarians and historians, artists including Tsuguharu Foujita, Maurice de Vlaminck and Georges Braque, well-known authors, editors, publishers Armand Colin and Hachette, and professors, including the many who donated their own collections of his photographs to institutions. The address book lists also contacts at publications, such as L'Illustration, Revue Hebdomadaire, Les Annales politiques et litteraires, and l'Art et des artistes. Institutional collectors of Old Paris documents, including archives, schools, and museums, were also a keen clientele and brought him commercial success, with commissions from the Bibliotèque Historique de la Ville de Paris in 1906 and 1911 and the sale of various albums of photographs to the Bibliotèque Nationale.

Atget's photographs attracted the attention of, and were purchased by, artists such as Henri Matisse, Marcel Duchamp and Picasso in the 1920s, as well as Maurice Utrillo, Edgar Degas and André Derain, some of whose views are seen from identical vantage-points at which Atget took pictures, and were likely made with the assistance of his photographs bought from the photographer for a few cents.

By the end of his career, Atget had worked methodically and concurrently on thirteen separate series of photographs including 'Landscape Documents', 'Picturesque Paris', 'Art in Old Paris', 'Environs', 'Topography of Old Paris', 'Tuileries', 'Vielle France', 'Interiors', 'Saint Cloud', 'Versailles', 'Parisian Parks', 'Sceaux' and a smaller series on costumes and religious arts, returning to subjects after they had been put aside for many years.

== Atget and the concept of a work of art ==
=== Atget and the problem of the archive ===
Many scholars of Atget's work treat the principle of the archive as the basis of his artistic program. The research of Maria Morris Hambourg and John Szarkowski revised this understanding, arguing that Atget was not building a single pictorial monolith but a catalogue forming part of an artistic and semantic system. This allows his works to be read as a specific artistic program and as an example of non-logical forms in photography.

=== Atget's photographs: the problem of the work of art ===
A central problem in Atget's work is the balance between fiction and documentary. He made his photographs as utilitarian materials—documents for artists or archival images of Parisian monuments—and their artistic status was partly the product of later interpretation. Rosalind Krauss notes that a central theme in his work is the uncertainty of the boundaries of the work: it is not clear what should count as the work itself—a single chosen frame or the complete corpus of several thousand images. His photographs thus raised the question of what constitutes a single work and whether it can be regarded as an integral, complete whole.

== Surrealist appropriation ==
Man Ray, who lived on the same street as Atget in Paris, the rue Campagne-Première in Montparnasse, purchased and collected almost fifty of Atget's photographs into an album embossed with the name 'Atget', "coll. Man Ray" and a date, 1926. He published several of Atget's photographs in his La Révolution surréaliste; most famously in issue number 7, of 15 June 1926, his Pendant l'éclipse made fourteen years earlier and showing a crowd gathered at the Colonne de Juillet to peer through various devices, or through their bare fingers, at the Solar eclipse of 17 April 1912. Atget however did not regard himself as a Surrealist. When Ray asked Atget if he could use his photo, Atget said: "Don't put my name on it. These are simply documents I make." (Note: Atget quoted by Ray.) Man Ray proposed that Atget's pictures of staircases, doorways, ragpickers, and especially those with window reflections (when foreground and background mix and mannequins look ready to step out), had a Dada or Surrealist quality about them.

Abigail Solomon Godeau described some of Atget's photographs as surrealist.

== Atget and Walter Benjamin ==
One of the earliest analytical texts about Atget is Walter Benjamin's essay "A Brief History of Photography" (1931). Benjamin views Atget as a forerunner of surrealist photography, effectively making him a member of the European avant-garde. In his understanding, Atget is a representative of a new photographic vision, and not a master of idyllic photographs of 19th-century Paris. He names Atget as the discoverer of the fragment that will become the central motif of the New Vision photograph. Benjamin notes that Atget liberates photography from the "aura" characteristic of both early 19th-century photography and classical works of art. Benjamin would go on to further investigate this topic (and Atget's work) in his essay "The Work of Art in the Age of Mechanical Reproduction".

== Recognition in America ==
He will be remembered as an urbanist historian, a genuine romanticist, a lover of Paris, a Balzac of the camera, from whose work we can weave a large tapestry of French civilization.

— Berenice Abbott (Note: Quoted in Krase & Adam 2008, p. 22.)

After Atget's death, his friend, the actor André Calmettes, sorted his work into two categories: 2,000 records of historic Paris, and photographs of all other subjects. He gave the former to the French government; he sold the others to the American photographer Berenice Abbott,

Atget created a comprehensive photographic record of the look and feel of nineteenth-century Paris just as it was being dramatically transformed by modernization, and its buildings were being systematically demolished.

When Berenice Abbott reportedly asked him whether the French appreciated his art, he responded, "No, only young foreigners." While Ray and Abbott claimed to have 'discovered' him around 1925, he was undoubtedly not the unknown 'primitive' 'tramp' or 'Douanier Rousseau of the street' that they took him for; he had, since 1900, as counted by Alain Fourquier, 182 reproductions of 158 images in 29 publications and had sold, between 1898 and 1927 and beyond the postcards he published, sometimes more than 1000 pictures a year to public institutions including the Bibliothèque Nationale, Bibliothèque Historique de la Ville de Paris, Musée Carnavalet, Musée de Sculpture Comparé, École des Beaux-Arts, the Directorate of Fine Arts and others.

During the Depression in the 1930s, Abbott sold half of her collection to Julian Levy, who owned a gallery in New York. Since he had difficulty selling the prints, he allowed Abbott to keep them. In the late 1960s, Abbott and Levy sold Atget's collection to The Museum of Modern Art. As MoMA bought it, the collection contained 1415 glass negatives and nearly 8,000 vintage prints from over 4,000 distinct negatives.

The publication of his work in the United States after his death and the promotion of his work to English-speaking audiences was due to Berenice Abbott. She exhibited, printed and wrote about his work, and assembled a substantial archive of writings about his portfolio by herself and others. Abbott published Atget, Photographe de Paris in 1930, the first overview of his photographic oeuvre and the beginning of his international fame. She also published a book with prints she made from Atget's negatives: The World of Atget (1964). Berenice Abbott and Eugene Atget was published in 2002.

As the city and architecture are two main themes in Atget's photographs, his work has been commented on and reviewed together with the work of Berenice Abbott and Amanda Bouchenoire, in the book Architecture and Cities. Three Photographic Gazes, where author Jerome Saltz analyzes historicist perspectives and considers their aesthetic implications: "(...) the three authors coincide in the search for and exaltation of intrinsic beauty in their objectives, regardless of quality and clarity of their references."

== Legacy ==
In 1929, eleven of Atget's photographs were shown at the Film und Foto Werkbund exhibition in Stuttgart.

The U.S. Library of Congress has some 20 prints made by Abbott in 1956. The Museum of Modern Art purchased the Abbott/Levy collection of Atget's work in 1968. MoMA published a four-volume series of books based on its four successive exhibitions of Atget's life and work, between 1981 and 1985.

In 2001, the Philadelphia Museum of Art acquired the Julien Levy Collection of Photographs, the centerpiece of which is a group of 361 photographs by Atget. Many of these photographs were printed by Atget himself and purchased by Levy directly from the photographer. Others came into Levy's possession when he and Berenice Abbott entered into a partnership to preserve Atget's studio in 1930. Eighty-three prints in the Levy Collection were made posthumously by Abbott as exhibition prints, produced directly from Atget's glass negatives. Additionally, the Levy Collection included three of Atget's photographic albums, which the photographer himself crafted. The most complete is an album of domestic interiors titled Intérieurs Parisiens Début du XXe Siècle, Artistiques, Pittoresques & Bourgeois. The other two albums are fragmentary. Album No. 1, Jardin des Tuileries has only four pages still intact, and the other lacks a cover and title but contains photographs from numerous Parisian parks. In total, the Philadelphia Museum of Art holds approximately 489 objects attributed to Atget.

Atget, a Retrospective was presented at the Bibliothèque Nationale of Paris in 2007.

The Atget crater on the planet Mercury is named after him, as is Rue Eugène-Atget in the 13th arrondissement of Paris.

Although no statement by Atget about his technique or aesthetic approach survives, he did sum up his life's work in a letter to the Minister of Fine Arts;

For more than 20 years I have been working alone and of my own initiative in all the old streets of Old Paris to make a collection of 18 × 24cm photographic negatives: artistic documents of beautiful urban architecture from the 16th to the 19th centuries...today this enormous artistic and documentary collection is finished; I can say that I possess all of Old Paris

— Eugène Atget, Atget, E. Letter to Paul Léon, Ministre des Beaux-Arts, November 12, 1920.

== Copyright ==
The U.S. Library of Congress was unable to determine the ownership of the twenty Atget photographs in its collection, thus suggesting that they are technically orphan works. Abbott clearly had a copyright on the selection and arrangement of his photographs in her books, which is now owned by Commerce Graphics. The Library also stated that the Museum of Modern Art, which owns the collection of Atget's negatives, reported that Atget had no heirs and that any rights on these works may have expired.

== Collections ==
- The Art Institute of Chicago, Chicago, IL
- International Center of Photography – New York, NY
- International Photography Hall of Fame – St. Louis, MO
- The J. Paul Getty Museum – Los Angeles, CA
- Bisazza Foundation, Vicenza, Italy,

== Gallery ==
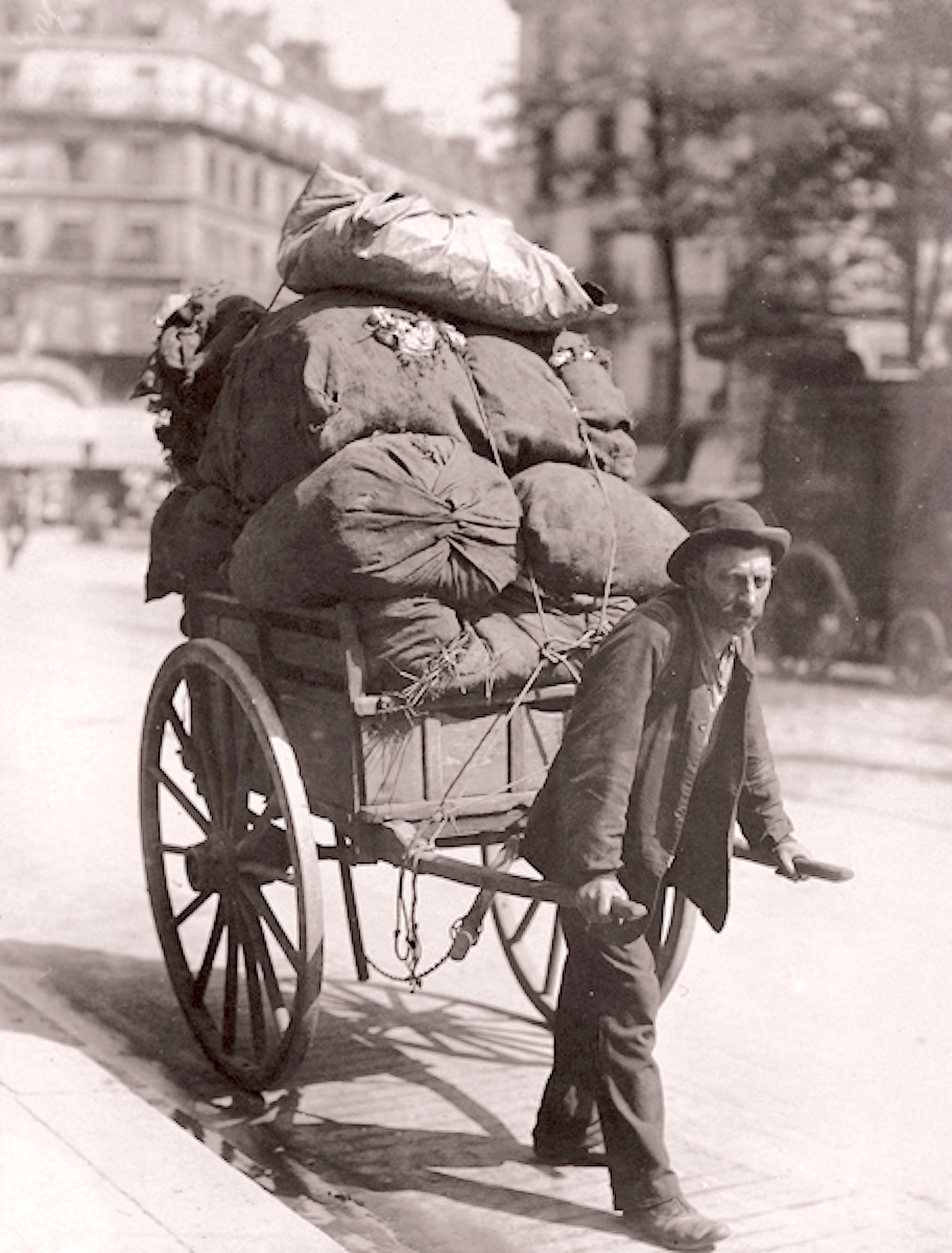
Rags collector, 1899

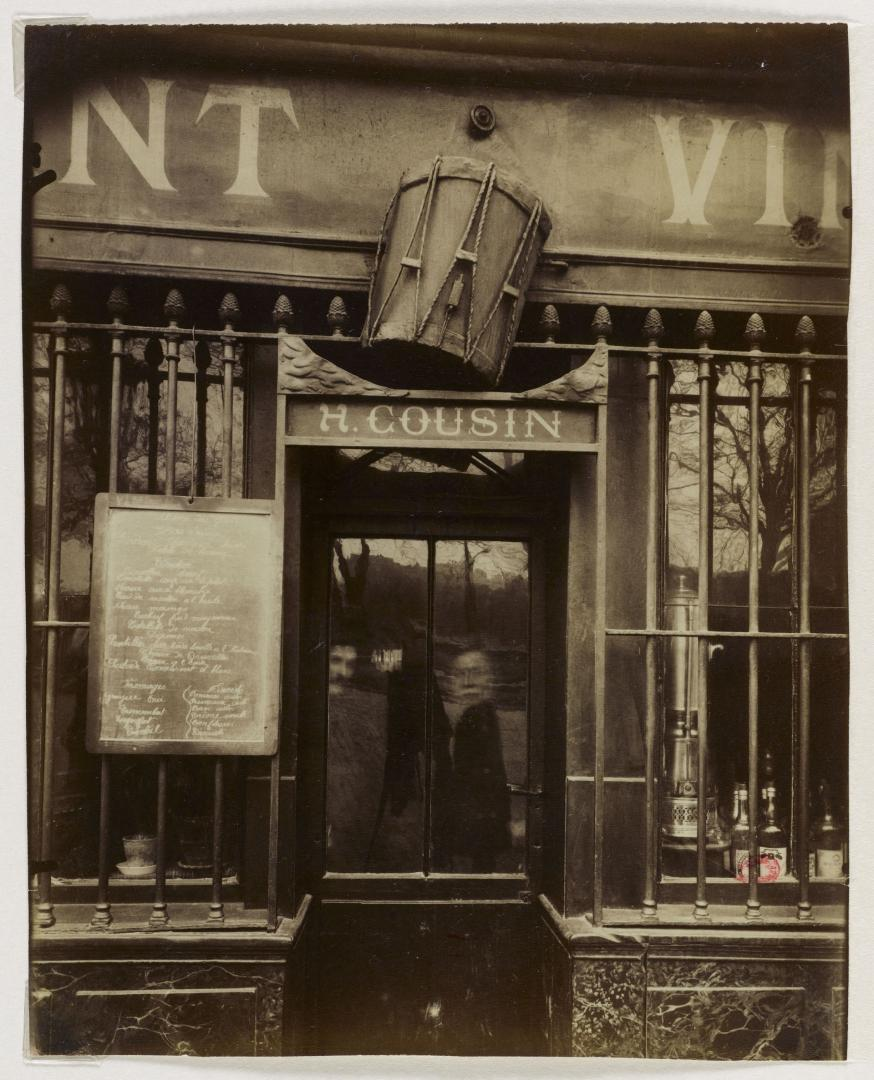
Au Tambour, 1908 (Note: Note reflection of Atget's tripod and camera covered by a black cloth.)

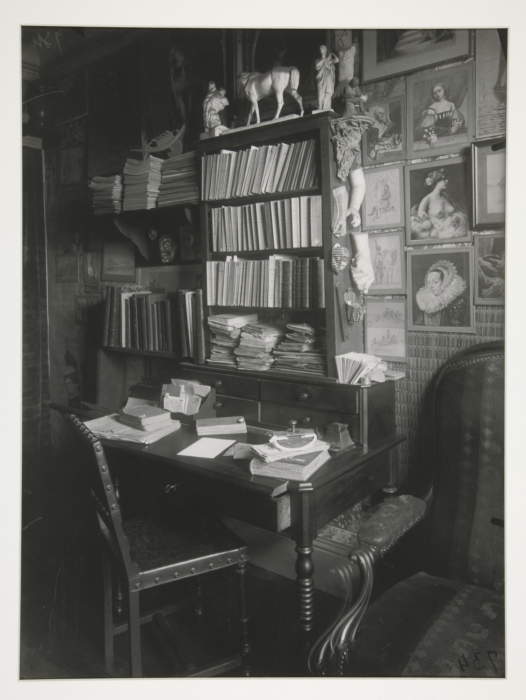
Atget's Salon, c. 1910

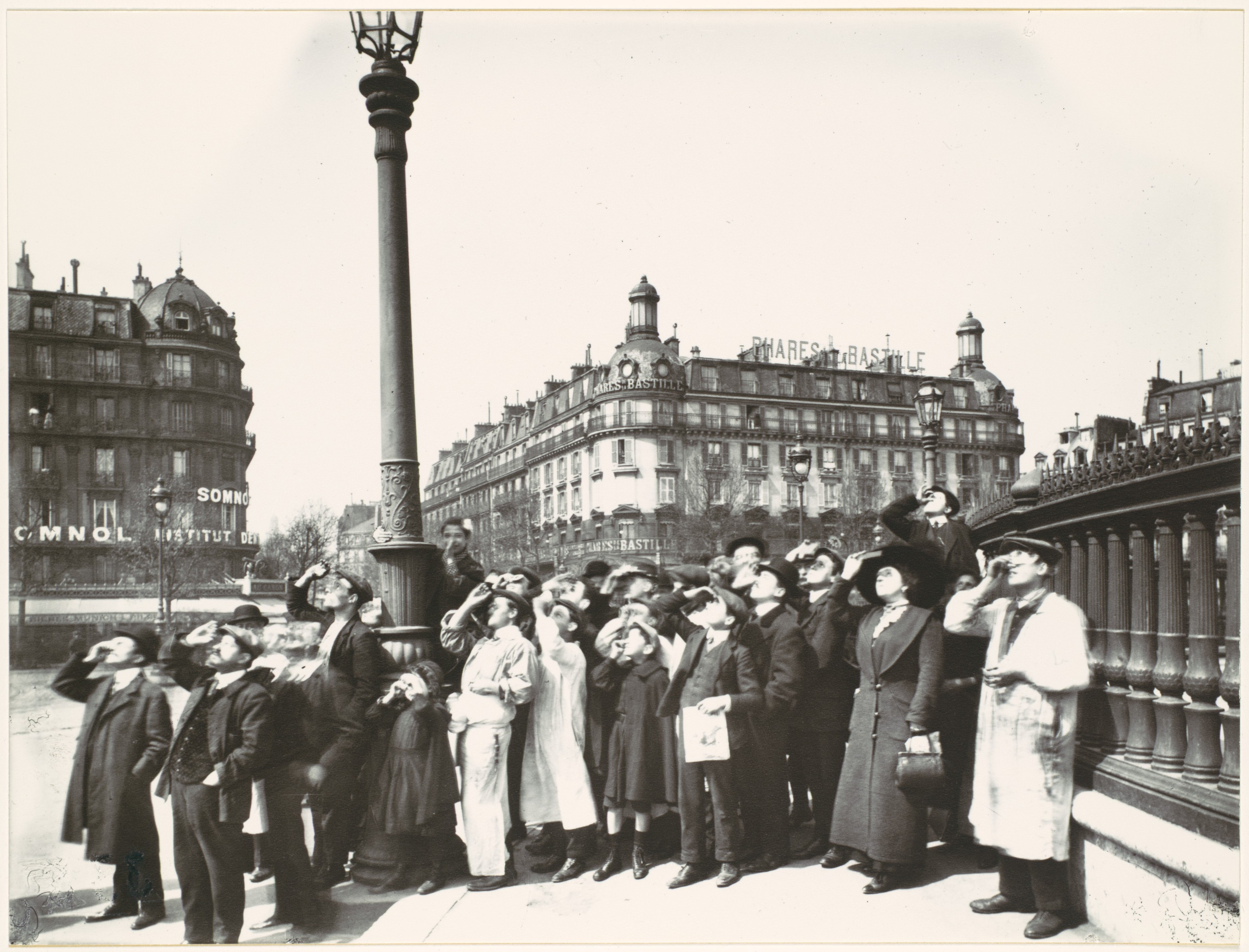
People watching the solar eclipse of 1912 (Note: This image appeared on the front of La Révolution surréaliste no. 7, 15 June 1926.)

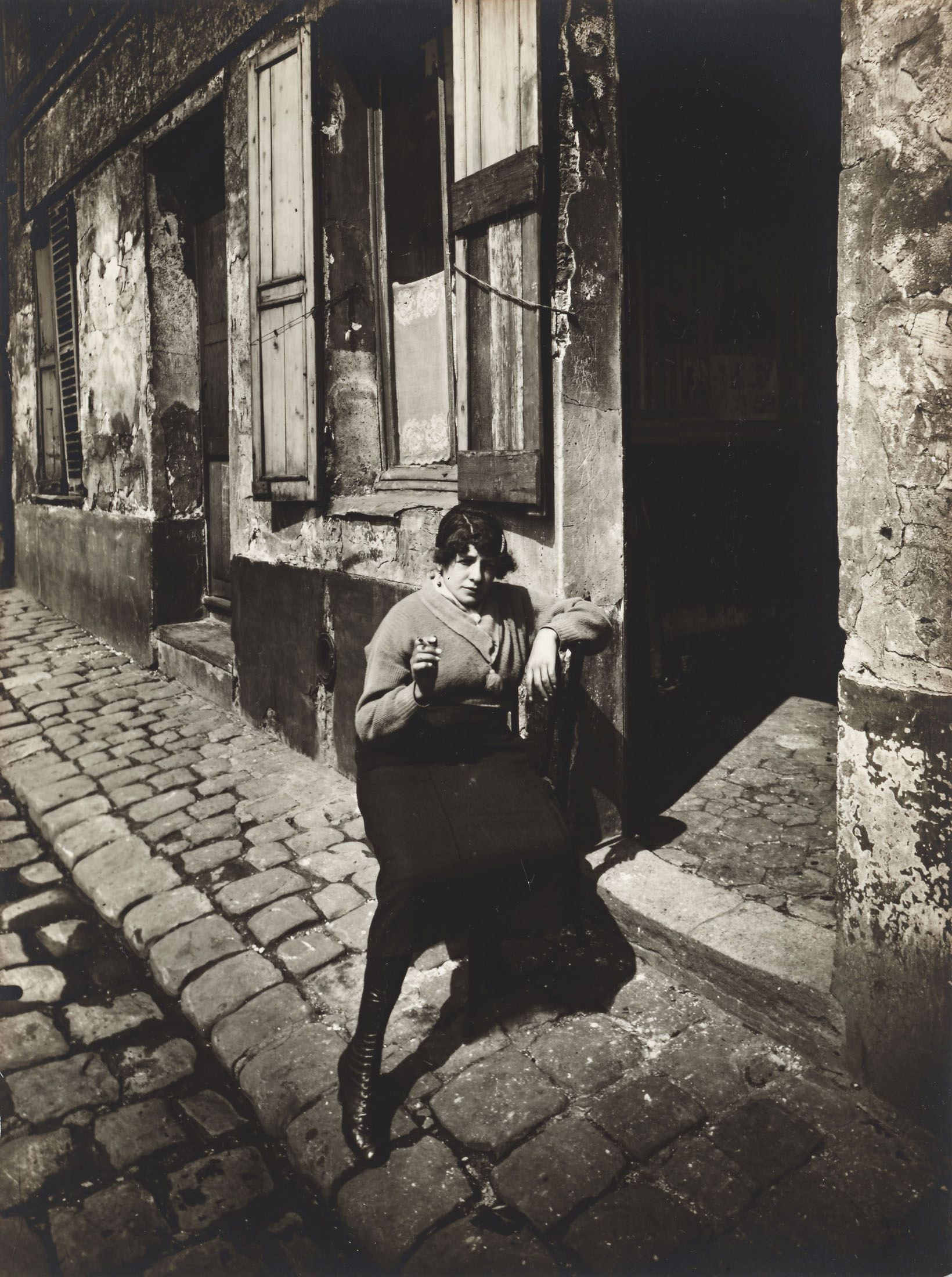
Prostitute waiting in front of her door, 1921

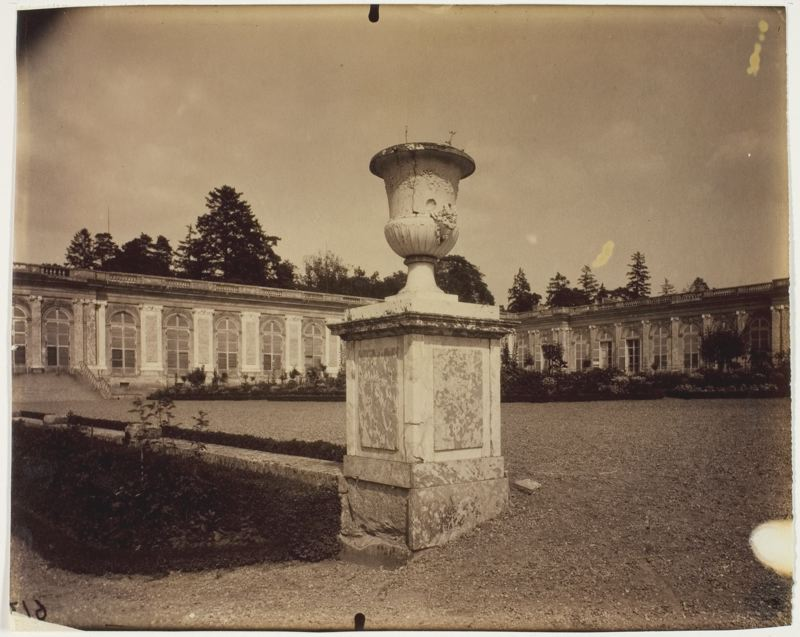
Grand Trianon, Versailles

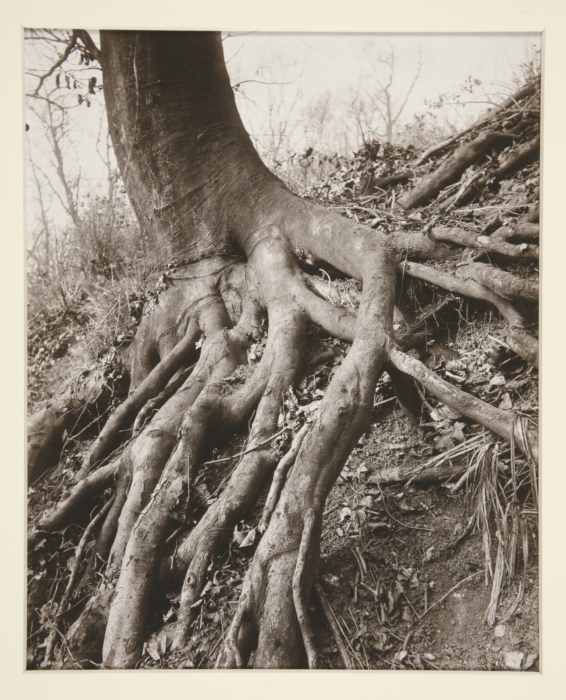
Saint-Cloud, 1924

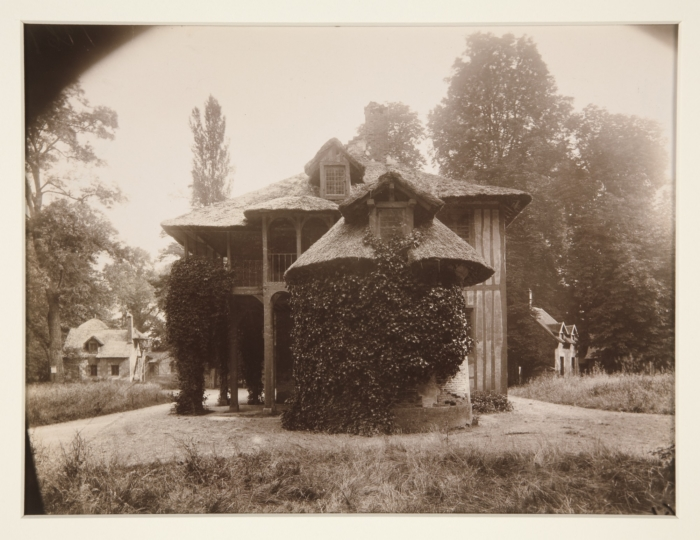
Hameau de la reine, Versailles, 1926
