= Apollodorus (crater) =

Crater on Mercury

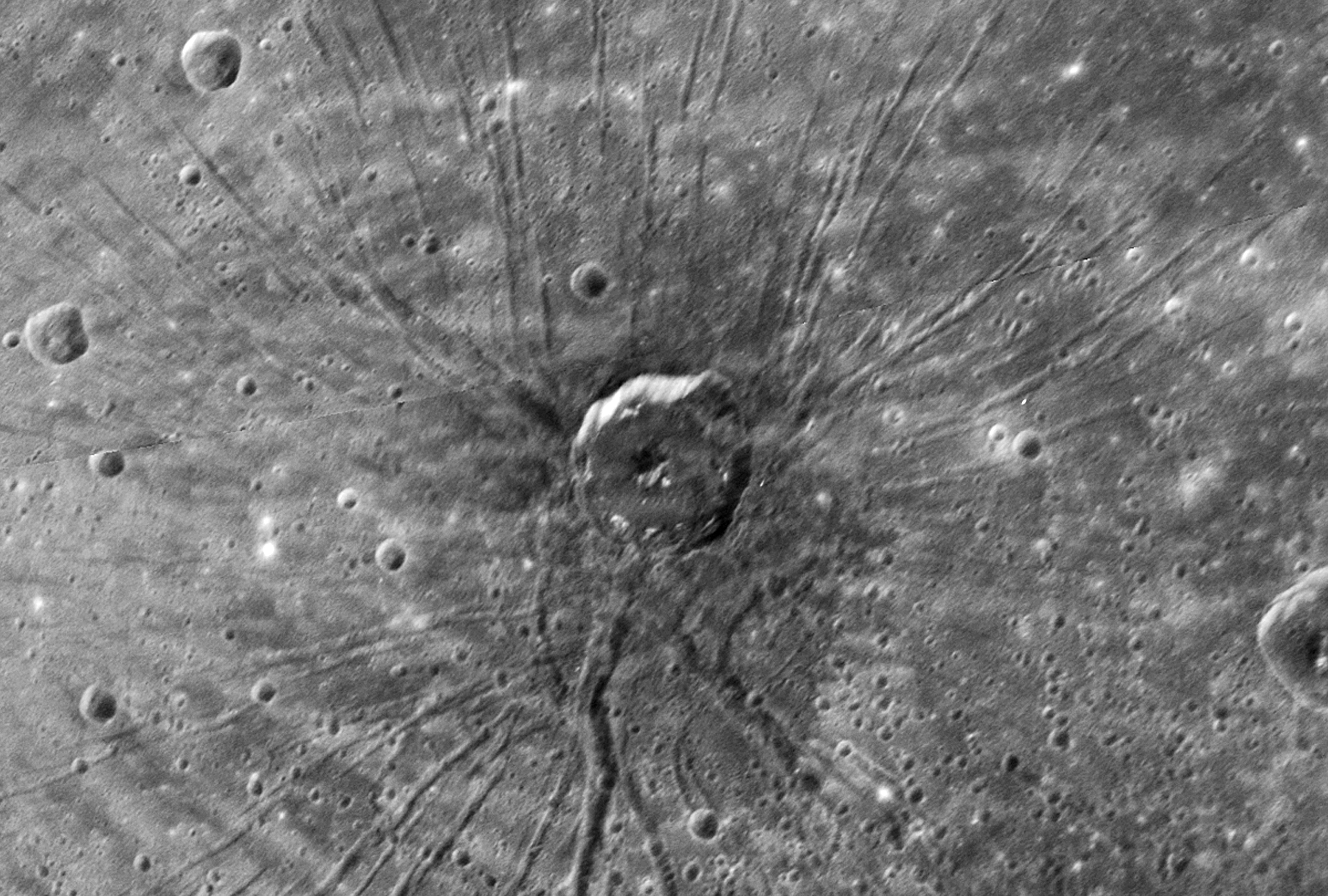
- Apollodorus lies near the center of the Pantheon Fossae trough pattern. MESSENGER image
- Feature type: Impact crater
- Location: Raditladi quadrangle, Mercury
- Coordinates: 30.58°N 197.01°W
- Diameter: 41 km (25 mi)
- Eponym: Apollodorus of Damascus

Apollodorus is an impact crater on Mercury. Its unusual appearance, with radiating dark troughs, led to a nickname of "the Spider" by scientists before its official name was decided. Apollodorus is located near the center of Pantheon Fossae, which is a system of radial grabens situated in the inner part of the Caloris basin. The floor, rim and walls of Apollodorus expose a low reflectance material (LRM) excavated during the impact from beneath the light volcanic plains, which cover the central part of the Caloris.

It is not currently known whether it played a role in the fossae's formation or if its location is merely a coincidence, although no graben appears to cut the crater rim, and the dark impact ejecta partially covers grabens, suggesting that Apollodorus postdates Pantheon Fossae. In addition, the crater is slightly (by about 40 km) offset from the exact center of the Pantheon Fossae.

Apollodorus of Damascus is credited as the architect of the Pantheon in Rome.

== Views ==
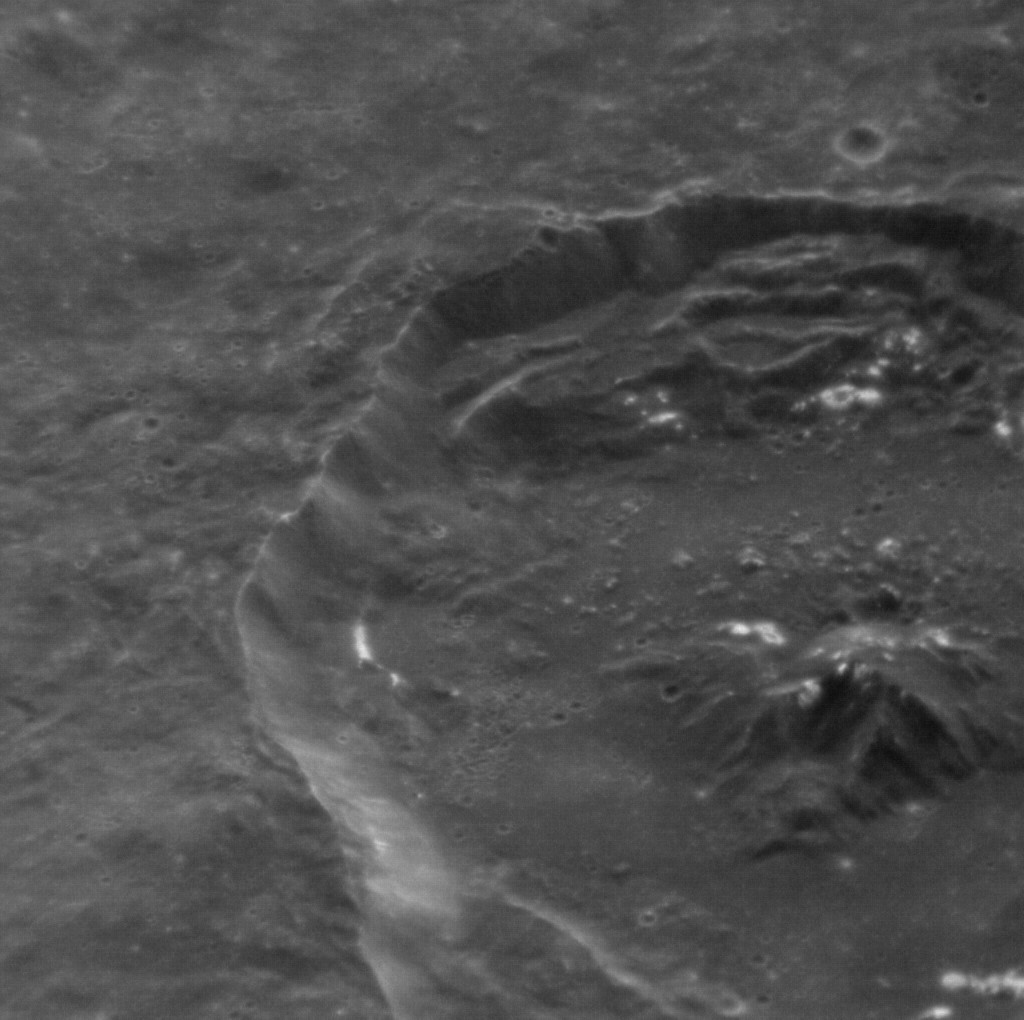
MESSENGER image at high sun angle, showing the northern crater and possible hollows

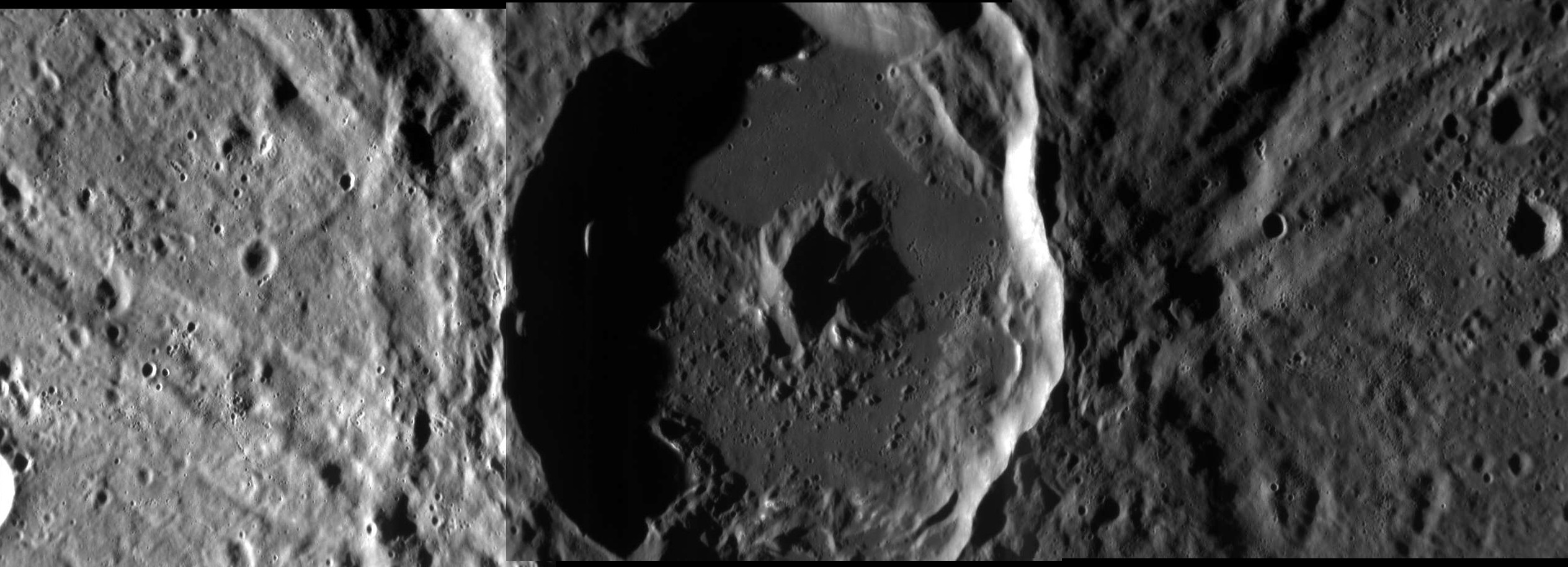
Mosaic of MESSENGER images
