= Pantheon Fossae =

Fossae on Mercury

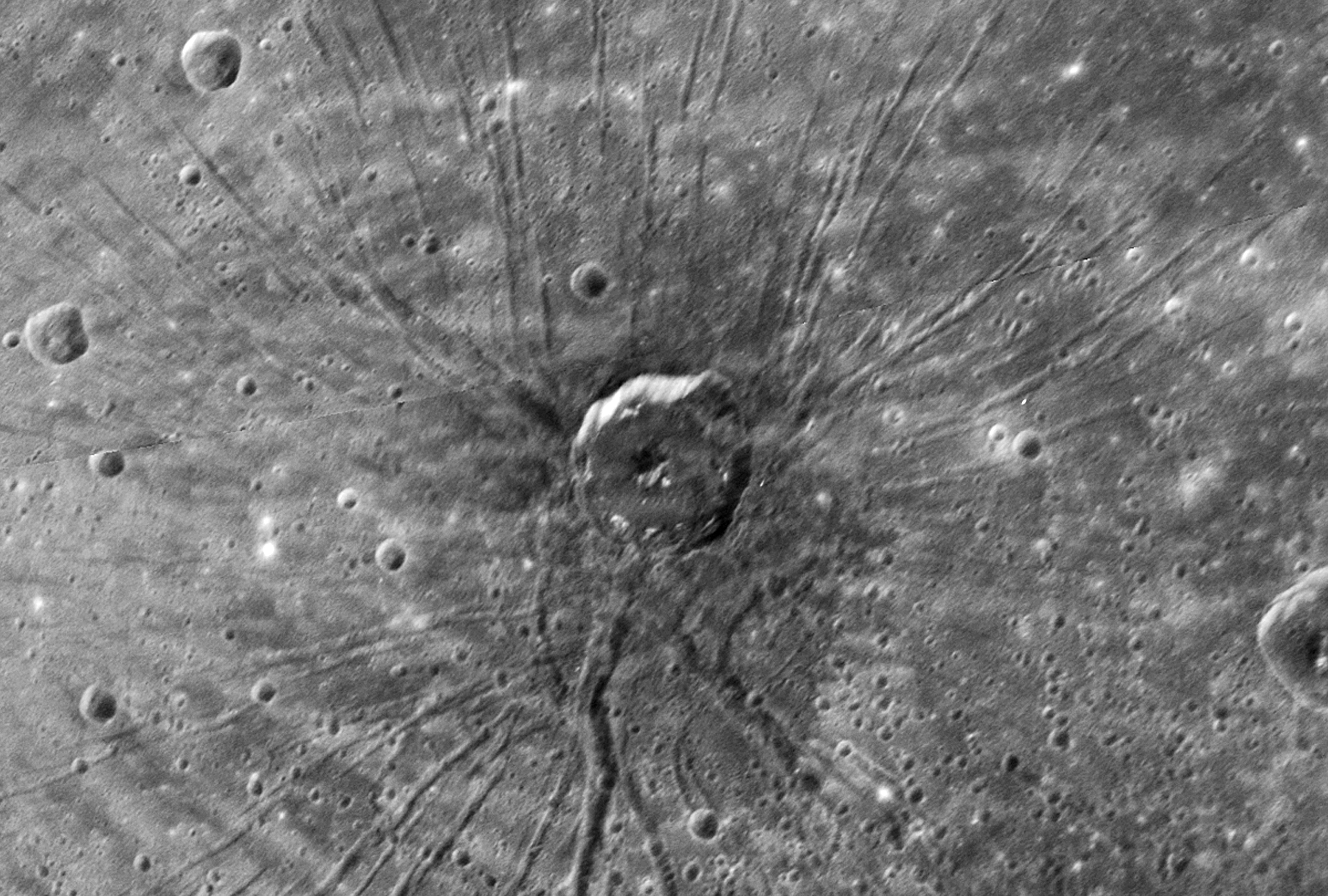
- Feature type: Fossae
- Coordinates: 30.5°N 197.0°W
- Eponym: Pantheon, Rome

The Pantheon Fossae /pænˈθiːən ˈfɒsiː/ are a radial set of troughs in a region in the middle of Caloris Basin on Mercury. They appear to be a set of graben formed by extensional faults, with a 40 km crater located near the center of the pattern. The exact origin of this pattern of troughs is not currently known. The feature was nicknamed "the Spider" before receiving its official name.

The name is taken from the Pantheon in Rome, an ancient temple with a classic domed roof. The dome of the Pantheon has a series of sunken panels that radiate from a central circular opening at the top of the dome, and Mercury's Pantheon Fossae is reminiscent of this pattern. Consequently, the crater near the center of Pantheon Fossae is now named Apollodorus, after the Greek engineer Apollodorus who is credited by some as being the architect of the Pantheon. MESSENGER scientists are debating whether Apollodorus played a role in the formation of Pantheon Fossae or whether the crater is simply from a later impact that occurred close to the center of the radial pattern.
