= List of geological features on Mercury =

Different types of geological features on the planet Mercury are named after different things: Mercurian ridges are called dorsa, and are named after astronomers who made detailed studies of the planet; valleys are called valles, and are named after ancient abandoned cities, towns, and settlements; crater chains are called catenae and are named after radio telescope facilities; plains are called planitiae, and most are named after mythological names associated with Mercury; escarpments are called rupes and are named after the ships of famous explorers; long, narrow depressions are called fossae and are named after works of architecture; bright spots are called faculae and are named after the word 'snake' in various languages.

== List of geological features on Mercury ==
Feature	Center Latitude	Center Longitude	Named after
Montes
Caloris Montes	31.46	174.15	Latin for 'mountains of heat'
Dorsa
Al-Shirazi Dorsum	-48.33	162.36	Qutb al-Din al-Shirazi
Antoniadi Dorsum	27.20	29.65	Eugène Antoniadi
Gan De Dorsum	13.65	313.79	Gan De
Peale Dorsum	-61.60	1.01	Stanton J. Peale
Pettengill Dorsum	79.00	9.96	Gordon Pettengill
Schiaparelli Dorsum	23.26	164.30	Giovanni Schiaparelli
Somayāji Dorsum	52.99	164.37	Nilakantha Somayaji
Trask Dorsum	56.22	333.83	Newell J. Trask
Fossae
Borobudur Fossae	−32.77	271.50	Borobudur
Pantheon Fossae	30.19	197.17	The Pantheon, Rome
Valles
Angkor Vallis	57.28	245.96	Angkor, ancient city in Cambodia
Cahokia Vallis	65.55	233.06	Cahokia Mounds, ancient city in Illinois, United States
Caral Vallis	62.66	230.71	Caral, ancient city in Peru
Paestum Vallis	60.28	233.96	Paestum, ancient city in Campania, Italy
Timgad Vallis	60.88	243.56	Timgad, ancient city in Algeria
Planitiae
Apārangi Planitia	6.70	289.38	Māori word for Mercury
Borealis Planitia	67.30	327.40	Latin for 'northern plain'
Budh Planitia	19.52	150.46	Hindu word for Mercury
Caloris Planitia	31.65	198.02	Latin for 'plain of heat'
Lugus Planitia	−6.24	98.66	Gaulish equivalent of the Roman god Mercury
Mearcair Planitia	31.40	227.90	Irish and Scottish Gaelic word for Mercury
Odin Planitia	23.60	169.86	Norse god Odin
Otaared Planitia	18.26	337.61	Arabic word for Mercury
Papsukkal Planitia	−16.25	271.63	Akkadian messenger god
Sihtu Planitia	−2.82	55.57	Babylonian word for the planet Mercury
Sobkou Planitia	39.00	128.02	Ancient Egyptian messenger god
Stilbon Planitia	57.54	209.61	Ancient Greek word for Mercury
Suisei Planitia	60.88	147.81	Japanese for Mercury
Tir Planitia	−1.04	176.69	Persian for Mercury
Turms Planitia	−31.05	350.81	Etruscan messenger god equivalent of Roman god Mercury
Utaridi Planitia	−65.50	270.17	Swahili name for Mercury
Rupēs
Acadia Rupes	8.17	329.00	CSS Acadia, Canadian hydrographic survey and oceanographic research vessel
Adventure Rupes	−65.48	65.30	HMS Adventure, ship of Captain Cook
Alpha Crucis Rupes	−12.48	228.31	Alpha Crucis, Brazilian oceanographic research vessel
Altair Rupes	−70.48	186.49	Altair, Mexican research vessel
Alvin Rupes	8.30	208.72	DSV Alvin, American deep-ocean research submersible
Antares Rupes	18.06	229.42	Antares, Mexican oceanographic research vessel
Arquipelago Rupes	7.36	229.31	Arquipelago, Portuguese coastal research vessel
Astrolabe Rupes	−42.55	70.90	Astrolabe, ship of Jules Dumont d'Urville
Beagle Rupes	−3.22	259.24	HMS Beagle, ship on which Charles Darwin sailed
Belgica Rupes	−50.45	296.24	RV Belgica, Belgian ship that was the first to winter in the Antarctic
Blossom Rupes	−3.04	270.15	HMS Blossom, English ship that explored the Northwest Passage under Frederick William Beechey
Calypso Rupes	19.53	316.48	RV Calypso, oceanographic research vessel of Jacques-Yves Cousteau
Carnegie Rupes	58.52	53.25	Carnegie, research vessel used for magnetic surveys
Carrasco Rupes	−9.66	218.97	BAP Carrasco, Peruvian Navy oceanographic research vessel
Challenger Rupes	−12.58	109.92	HMS Challenger, survey ship used to undertake the first global marine research expedition
Chikyu Rupes	−53.82	259.62	Chikyū is a Japanese scientific drilling ship built for the IODP
Darshak Rupes	−14.50	47.42	INS Darshak is a Sandhayak-class hydrographic survey ship in the Indian Navy, under the Eastern Naval Command
Discovery Rupes	−54.70	37.24	HMS Discovery, ship of Captain Cook
Duyfken Rupes	−20.88	131.93	Duyfken, ship of Willem Janszoon
Eltanin Rupes	−74.99	269.40	USNS Eltanin, American icebreaker and Antarctic research vessel
Endeavour Rupes	38.36	31.38	HM Bark Endeavour, ship of Captain Cook
Endurance Rupes	21.60	217.81	Endurance, a British three-masted barquentine led by Ernest Shackleton on the Imperial Trans-Antarctic Expedition
Enterprise Rupes	−36.54	283.46	USS Enterprise, American ship that explored the Mississippi, Amazon, and Madeira Rivers
Fram Rupes	−57.68	93.20	Fram, ship of Fridtjof Nansen, Otto Sverdrup and Roald Amundsen
Gjöa Rupes	−66.89	158.50	Gjøa, ship of Roald Amundsen
Grönland Rupes	0.92	282.46	Grönland, German research ship
Heemskerck Rupes	27.30	124.31	Ship of Abel Tasman
Hero Rupes	−58.72	171.70	Hero, ship of Nathaniel Palmer
Hesperides Rupes	−2.98	189.55	BIO Hespérides, is a Spanish polar research vessel
Investigator Rupes	−25.39	223.96	RV Investigator, is an Australian marine research vessel operated by CSIRO for oceanographic and marine research
Kainan Rupes	−29.80	330.80	Kainan Maru, Japanese ship of Nobu Shirase Antarctic exploration
La Duaphine Rupes	66.30	26.62	Ship of Giovanni da Verrazzano
Meteor Rupes	−47.70	345.70	Meteor was a German survey vessel noted for her Atlantic Ocean survey work
Mirni Rupes	−38.54	39.01	Mirny, ship of Mikhail Lazarev
Nautilus Rupes	−28.23	293.33	EV Nautilus, research vessel operated by Robert Ballard
Palmer Rupes	−26.07	106.28	Nathaniel B. Palmer, American icebreaker and Antarctic research vessel operated
Paramour Rupes	−0.08	212.54	HMS Paramour, English research vessel commanded by Edmond Halley
Pelagia Rupes	15.33	218.59	RV Pelagia, Dutch research and survey vessel
Pourquoi-Pas Rupes	−58.54	156.17	Pourquoi-Pas, ship of Jean-Baptiste Charcot
Protea Rupes	−9.36	203.01	HMSAS Protea was the first hydrographic survey ship used by the South African Naval Service
Resolution Rupes	−63.25	50.66	HMS Resolution, ship of Captain Cook
Santa María Rupes	5.81	20.00	Santa María, ship of Christopher Columbus
Selen Rupes	−8.11	178.92	RV MTA Selen, Turkish research vessel operated by MTA
Soya Rupes	−6.47	293.37	Sōya was Japan's first dedicated Antarctic research vessel
Tangaroa Rupes	1.04	173.27	RV Tangaroa is a research vessel and icebreaker operated by Earth Sciences New Zealand for marine science and environmental monitoring
Terror Rupes	−72.06	275.69	HMS Terror, English ship of Arctic and Antarctic exploration
Unity Rupes	27.16	275.20	Unity, English ship on which Edmond Halley sailed to Saint Helena
Vejas Rupes	35.71	162.25	Vejas, Lithuanian research vessel
Victoria Rupes	52.71	34.16	Victoria, ship of Ferdinand Magellan
Volasiga Rupes	−36.22	146.00	The RFNS Volasiga is an oceanic survey vessel operated by the Republic of Fiji Navy
Vostok Rupes	−37.88	19.60	Vostok, ship of Fabian von Bellingshausen
Xuelong Rupes	57.27	182.87	Xue Long and Xue Long 2 are research vessels belonging to China
Yelcho Rupes	23.54	224.11	Yelcho is a Chilean steam-powered cutter that rescued the Endurance crew in Antarctica in 1916
Zapiola Rupes	72.36	44.02	Argentinian ship involved in oceanographic surveys in Southwestern Atlantic
Zarya Rupes	−42.73	20.42	Zarya, a Soviet experimental schooner
Zeehaen Rupes	49.64	158.15	Ship of Abel Tasman
Catenae
Arecibo Catena	−27.58	28.29	Arecibo Observatory
Goldstone Catena	−15.62	32.02	Goldstone Observatory
Haystack Catena	4.42	46.48	Haystack Observatory
Faculae
Abeeso Facula	21.70	214.60	Somali word for snake
Agwo Facula	22.40	213.70	Igbo word for snake
Ahas Facula	−21.37	89.40	Filipino word for snake
Amaru Facula	−49.80	349.50	Quechuan word for snake
Bibilava Faculae	16.40	202.80	Malagasy word for snake
Bitin Facula	−51.55	28.45	Cebuano word for snake
Coatl Facula	−29.75	216.55	Nahuatl word for snake
Ejo Faculae	14.50	200.50	Yoruba word for snake
Gata Facula	−52.90	321.40	Fijian and Samoan word for snake
Havu Facula	−52.22	28.45	Kannada word for snake
Ibab Facula	14.50	199.20	Amharic word for snake
Inyoka Faculae	14.00	197.70	Zulu and Xhosa word for snake
Maciji Facula	14.90	196.00	Hausa word for snake
Madu Facula	−21.24	74.87	Estonian word for snake
Nākahi Facula	−52.70	342.20	Maori word for snake
Nathair Facula	36.00	295.50	Irish and Scottish Gaelic word for snake
Neidr Facula	35.90	302.70	Welsh word for snake
Ngu Facula	−22.77	90.85	Lao word for snake
Nzoka Facula	15.40	194.70	Kamba word for snake
Orm Faculae	26.58	59.68	Swedish word for snake
Pampu Facula	−57.76	31.79	Tamil word for snake
Sarpa Facula	−53.07	30.87	Sinhalese word for snake
Serp Facula	3.90	309.06	Catalan word for snake
Slang Faculae	24.50	179.30	Afrikaans word for snake
Suge Facula	26.10	300.40	Basque word for snake
Thueban Facula	48.70	200.50	Arabic word for snake
Ular Facula	−55.10	29.95	Malay word for snake
Yinshe Facula	−46.32	191.22	Chinese word for silver snake
Zmija Facula	−37.35	267.75	Serbian word for snake

== See also ==
- List of craters on Mercury
- List of albedo features on Mercury
- List of quadrangles on Mercury
