= Hesiod (disambiguation) =

Hesiod (or Hēsíodos, sometimes latinized as Hesiodus) was an Ancient Greek poet generally thought to have been active between 750 and 650 BC, around the same time as Homer.

It may also refer to:

- Hesiod (name service), a computer application
- Hesiod (crater) on Mercury
- 8550 Hesiodos, the asteroid
- Hesiodus (crater) on the Moon
