= Balanchine (crater) =

Crater on Mercury

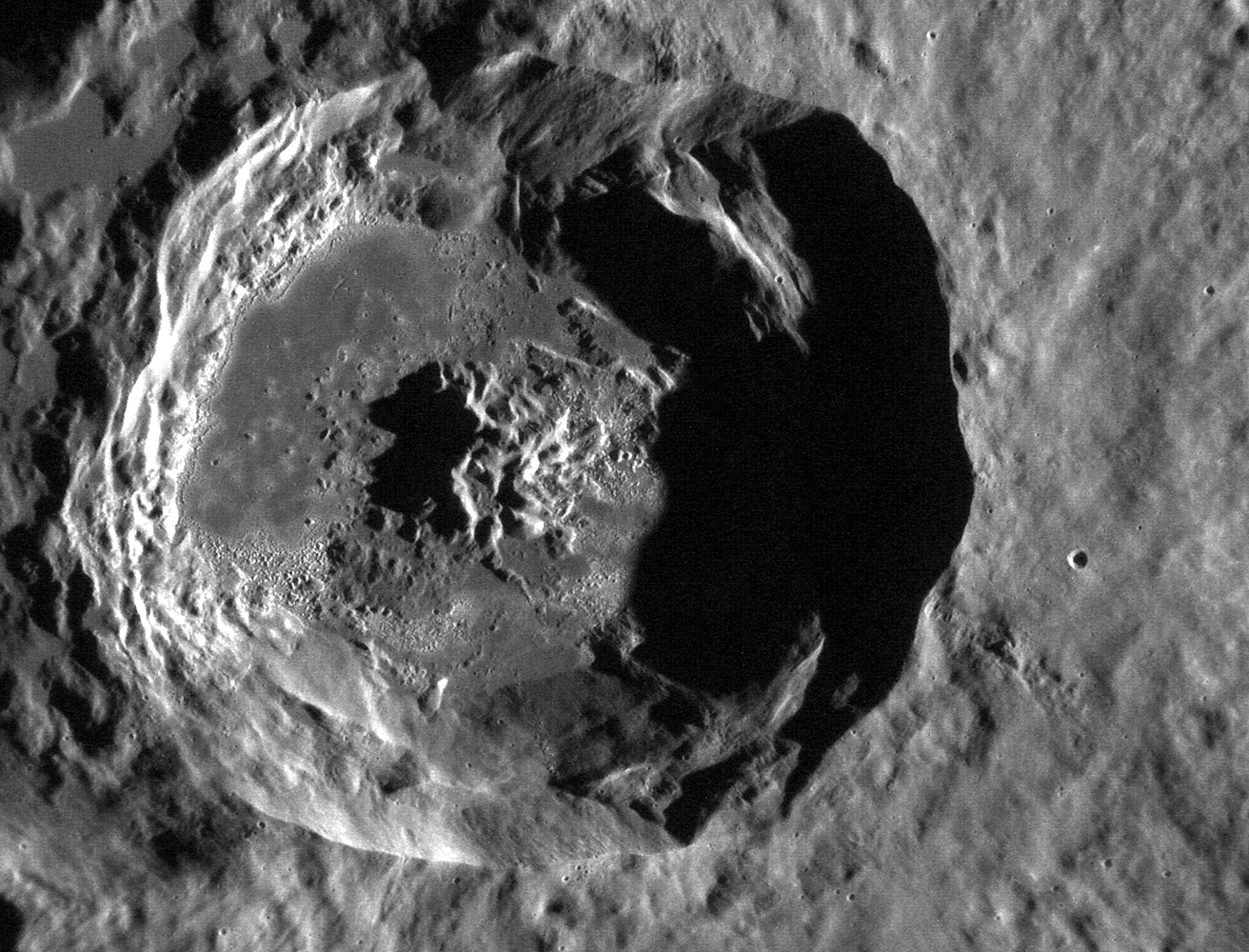
- MESSENGER image of Balanchine
- Feature type: Central-peak impact crater
- Location: Raditladi quadrangle, Mercury
- Coordinates: 38.47°N 184.48°W
- Diameter: 38 km
- Eponym: George Balanchine

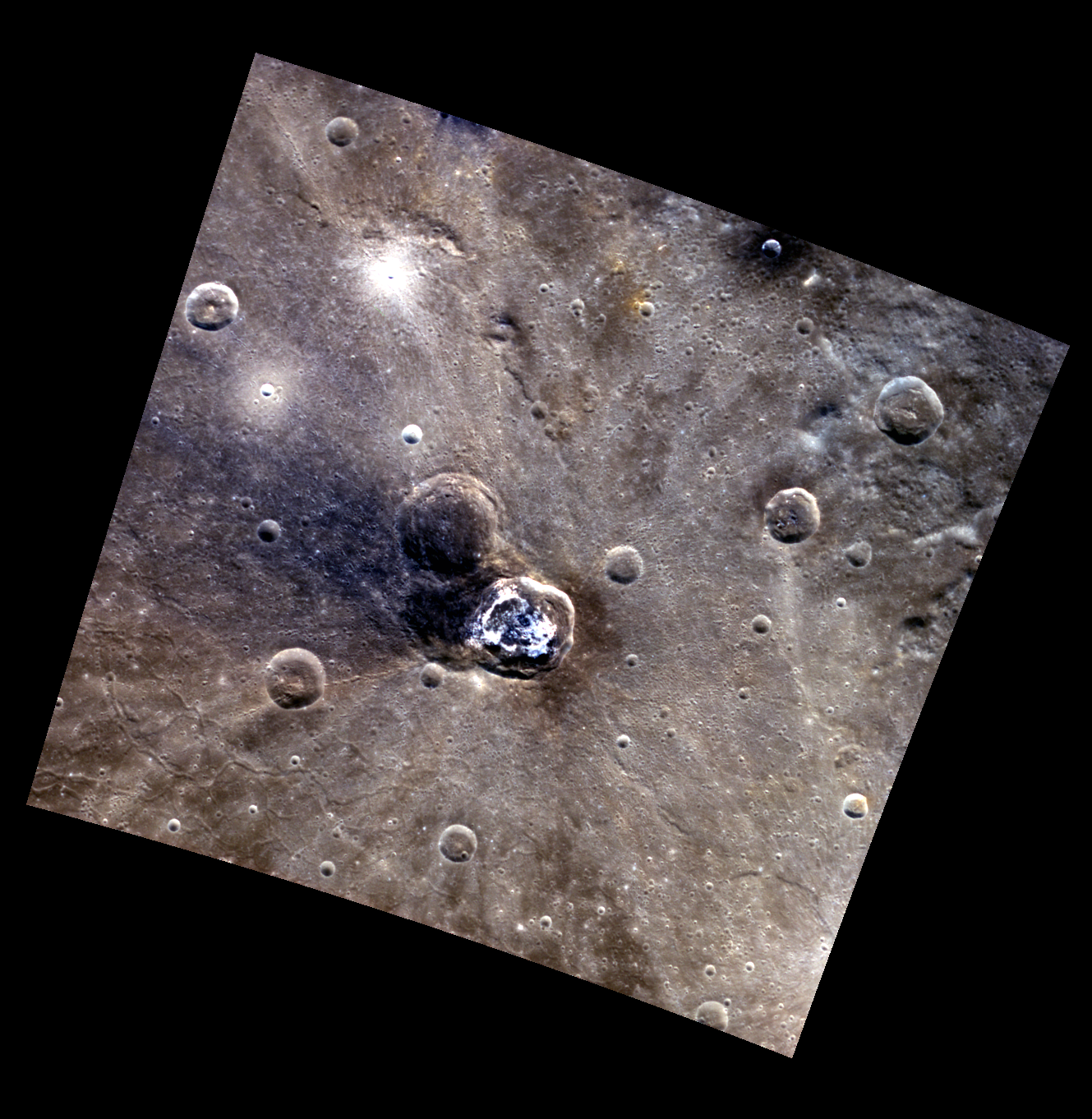
Approximate color image of Balanchine crater

Balanchine is an impact crater on the planet Mercury. It possesses a ray system of slightly blue rays which inspired its name due to resembling the tutu in George Balanchine's Serenade.

Extensive hollows are present within Balanchine, as well as an associated dark spot.

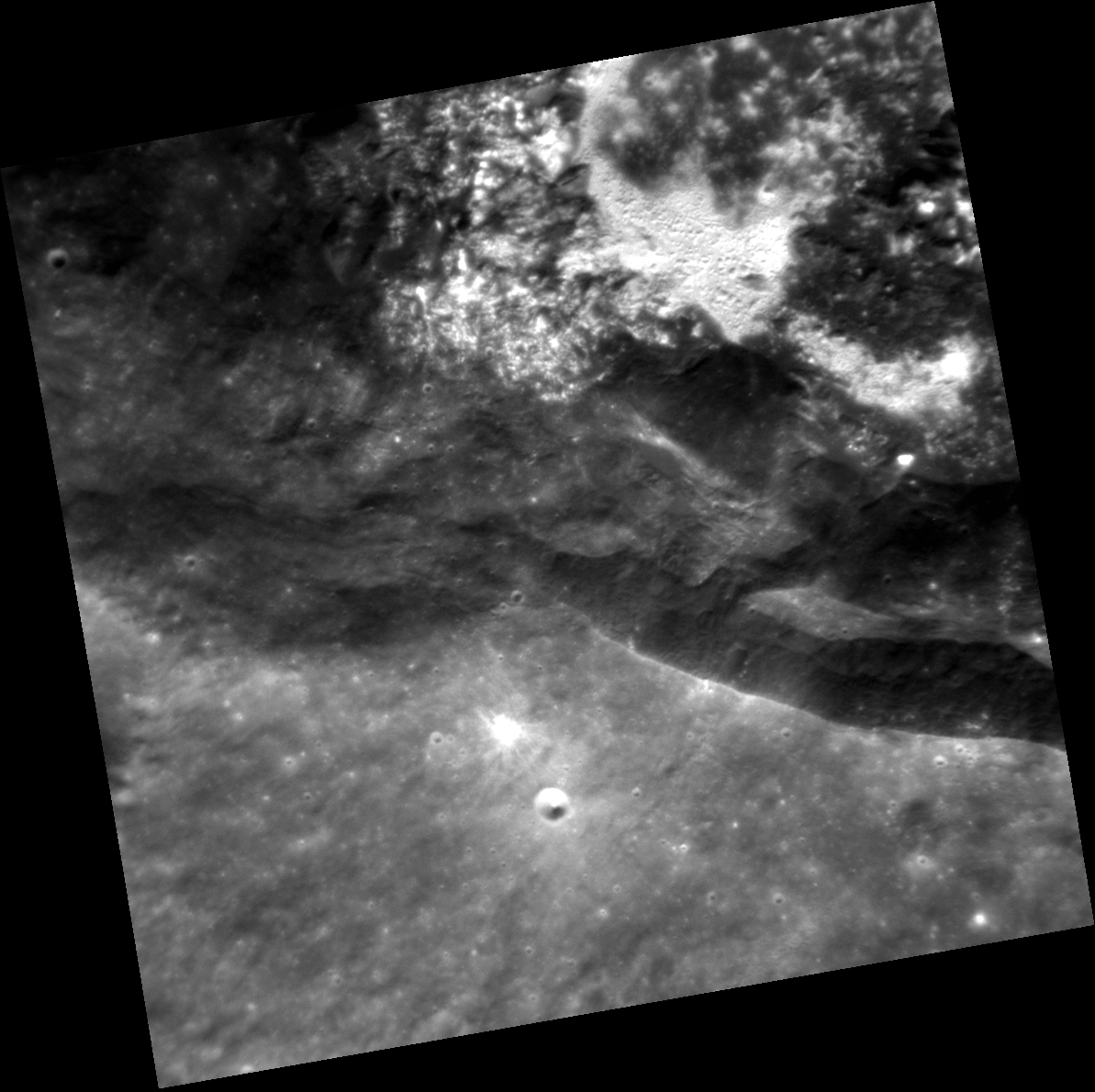
High-resolution view of some of the hollows

Balanchine lies in the northeast portion of the Caloris Basin. To its northeast is Nervo crater, and to its southeast March.
