= John V. Evans =

John V. Evans may refer to:

- John Evans (Idaho politician) (1925–2014), American politician from Idaho
- John V. Evans (astronomer) (born 1933), British-American radio astronomer
