= Kuniyoshi (crater) =

Crater on Mercury

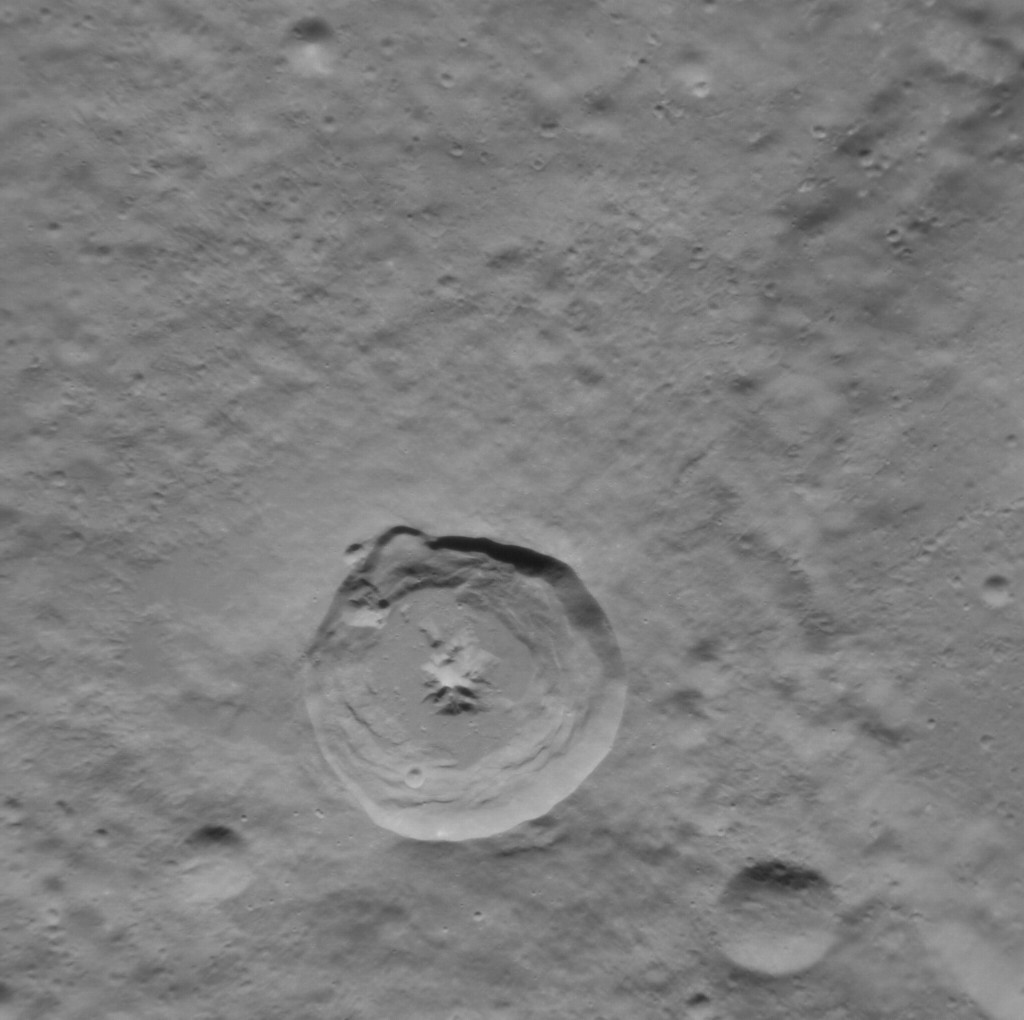
- MESSENGER image
- Planet: Mercury
- Coordinates: 57.87°S 37.49°W
- Quadrangle: Discovery
- Diameter: 27 km (17 mi)
- Eponym: Utagawa Kuniyoshi

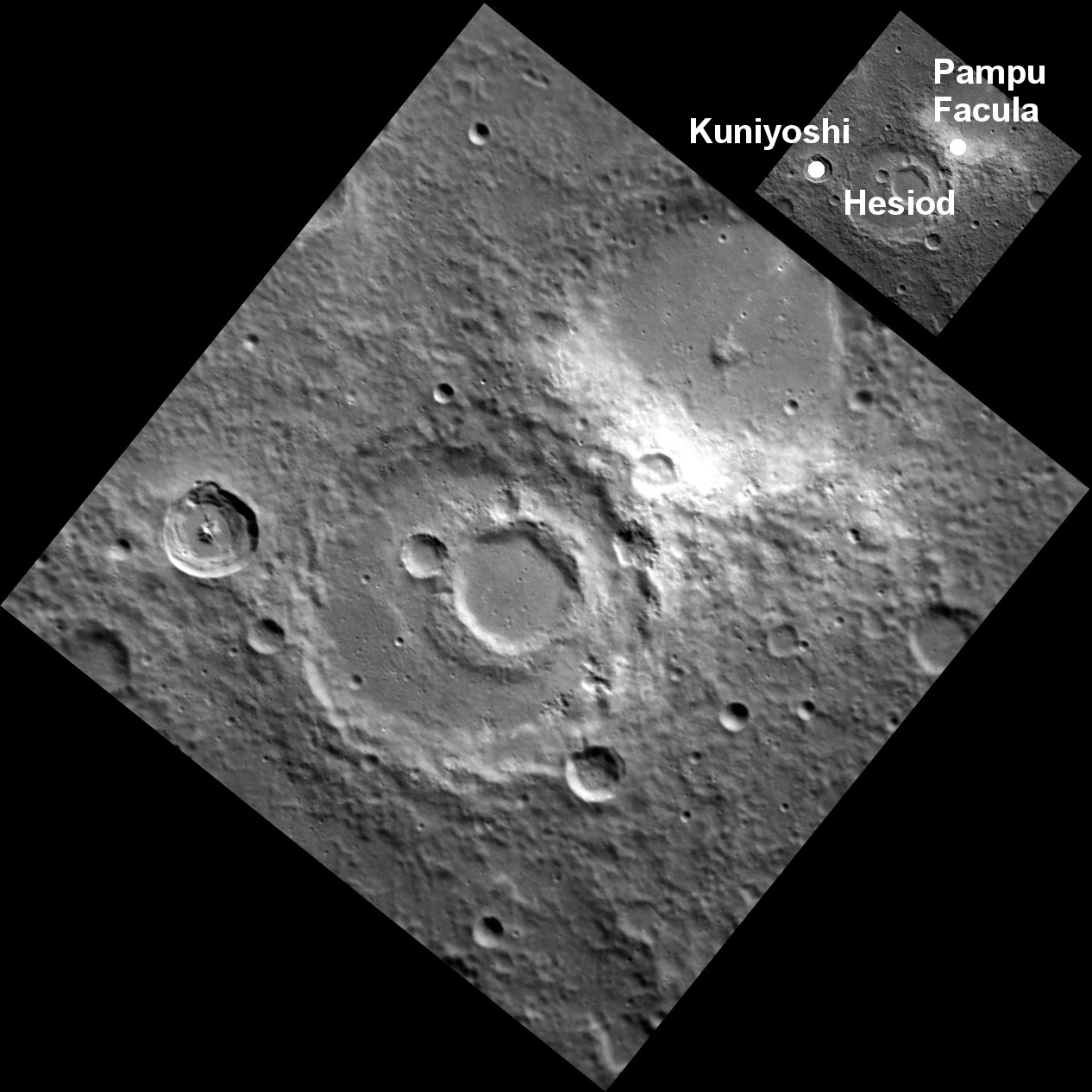
Image of nearby features

Kuniyoshi is a crater on Mercury. Its name was adopted by the International Astronomical Union (IAU) in 2014. It is named for the Japanese painter and printmaker Utagawa Kuniyoshi.

Kuniyoshi is a fresh crater of Kuiperian age.

To the east of Kuniyoshi are Hesiod crater and Pampu Facula, a bright region that is likely to be a site of explosive volcanism. There is a small irregular depression on the north rim of Kuniyoshi which may also be volcanic in origin.

Kuniyoshi is near the Discovery Rupes.
