= Haystack Observatory =

American microwave observatory owned by MIT

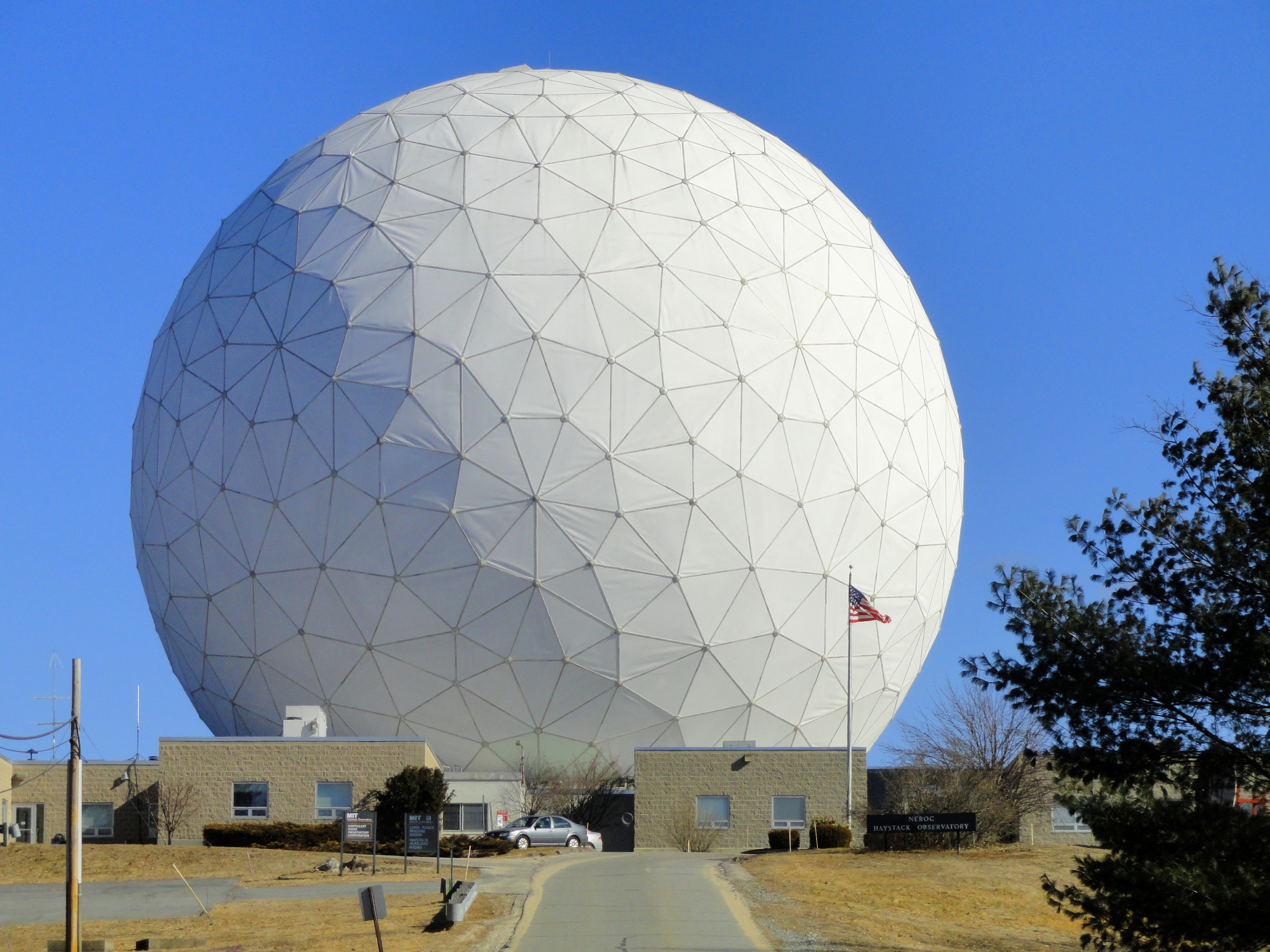
- The Haystack Radio Telescope at Haystack Observatory

- Alternative names: MIT Haystack Observatory
- Organization: Massachusetts Institute of Technology
- Observatory code: 254
- Location: Westford, Massachusetts
- Coordinates: 42°37′24″N 71°29′18″W
- Altitude: 131 m (430 ft)
- Established: 1960
- Website: www.haystack.mit.edu
- Telescopes: Haystack Radio Telescope; Westford Radio Telescope; Millstone Hill Observatory
- Location of Haystack Observatory
- Related media on Commons

Haystack Observatory is a multidisciplinary radio science center, ionospheric observatory, and astronomical microwave observatory owned by Massachusetts Institute of Technology (MIT). It is in Westford, Massachusetts, in the United States, about 45 kilometers (28 mi) northwest of Boston. The observatory was built by MIT's Lincoln Laboratory for the United States Air Force and was called the Haystack Microwave Research Facility. Construction began in 1960, and the antenna began operating in 1964. In 1970 the facility was transferred to MIT, which then formed the Northeast Radio Observatory Corporation (NEROC) with other universities to operate the site as the Haystack Observatory. As of January 2012, a total of nine institutions participated in NEROC.

The Haystack Observatory site is also the location of the Millstone Hill Geospace Facility, an atmospheric-sciences research center. Lincoln Laboratory continues to use the site, which it calls the Lincoln Space Surveillance Complex (LSSC). The George R. Wallace Astrophysical Observatory of MIT's Department of Earth, Atmospheric, and Planetary Sciences is south of the Haystack dome and east of the Westford dome. The Amateur Telescope Makers of Boston has its clubhouse on the MIT property.

Haystack Vallis on Mercury is named after this observatory.

== Telescopes and radars ==
=== Haystack Radio Telescope ===
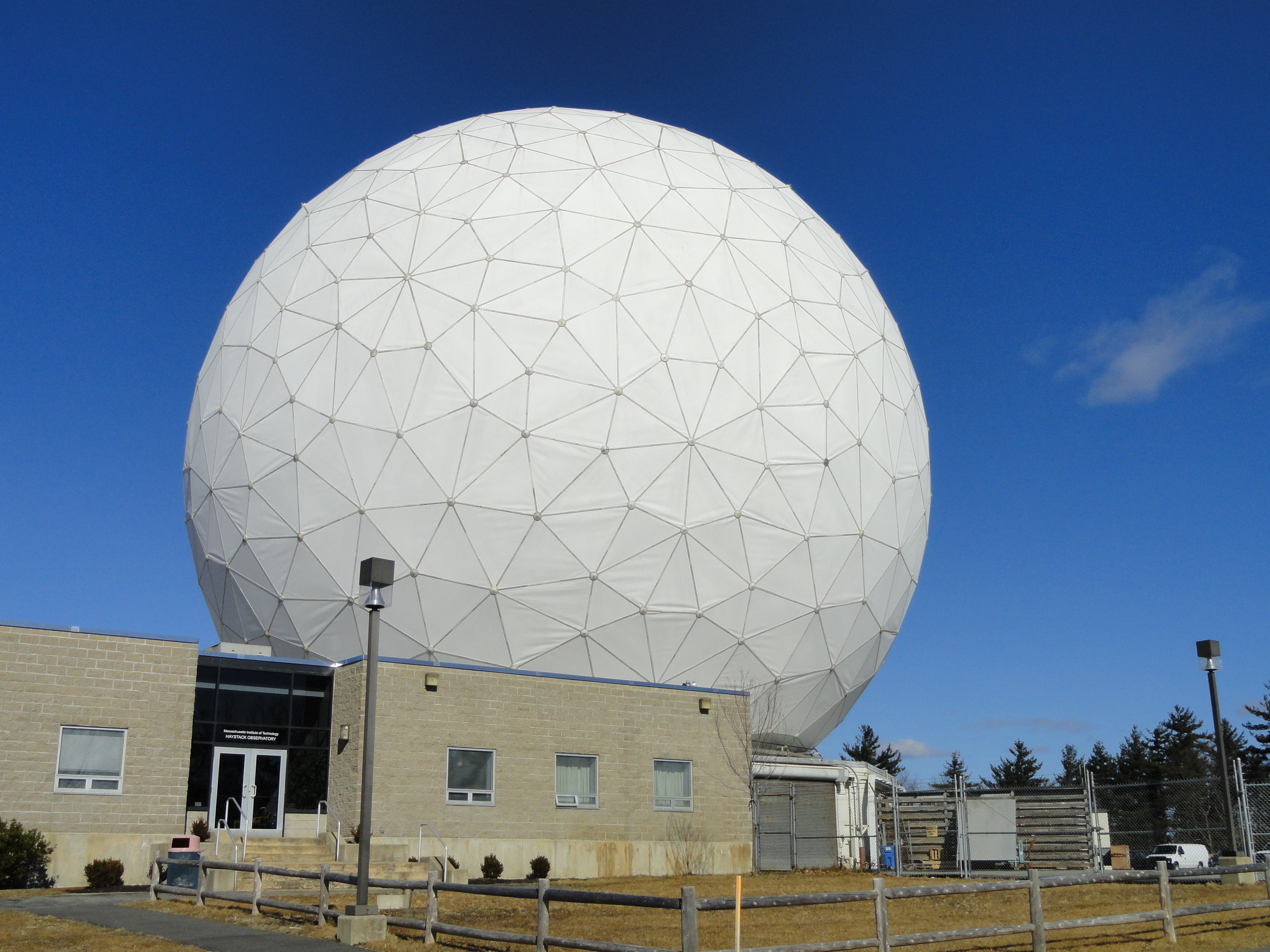
Haystack radio telescope at the MIT Haystack Observatory, Westford, MA

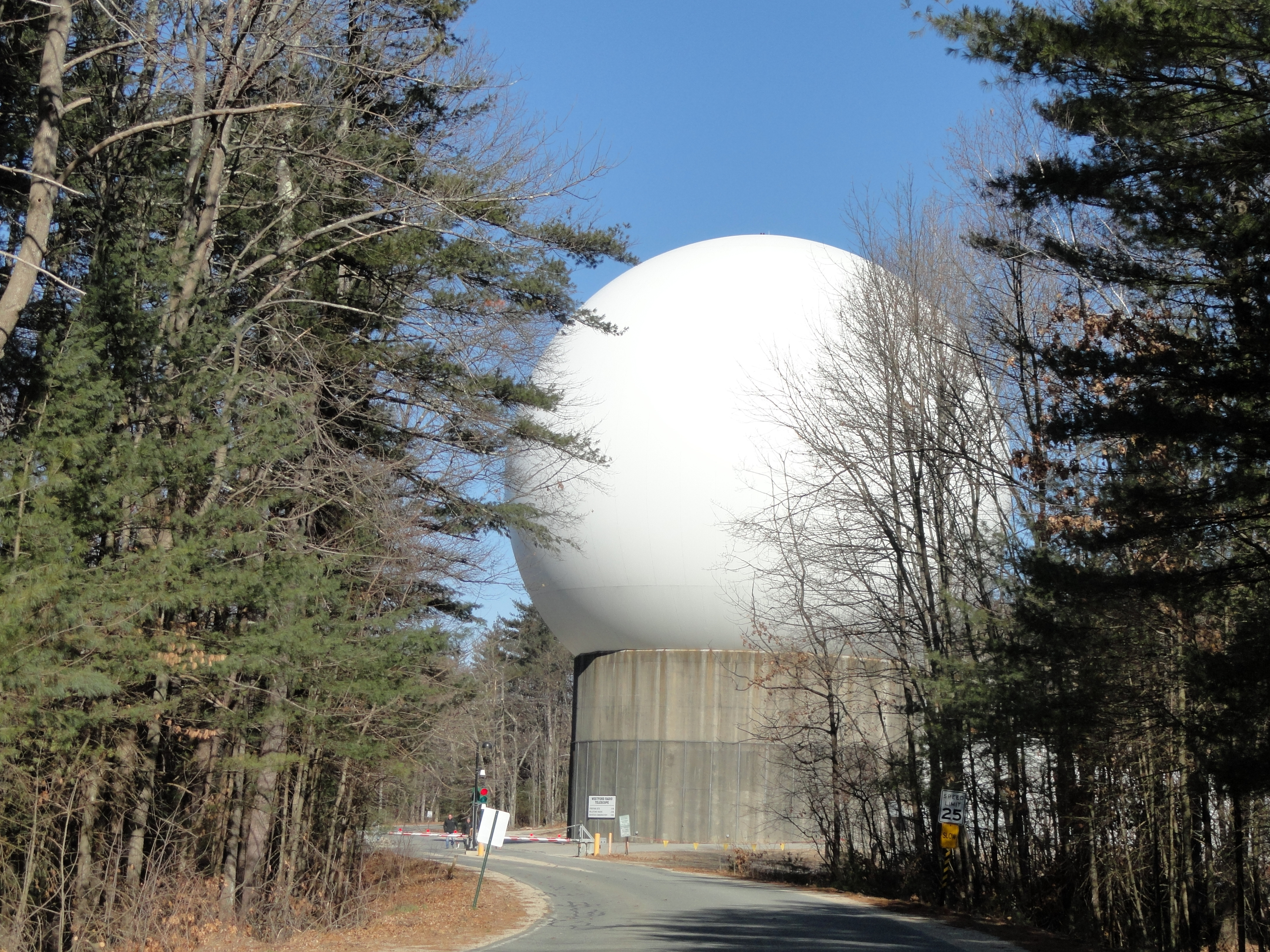
Westford Radio Telescope

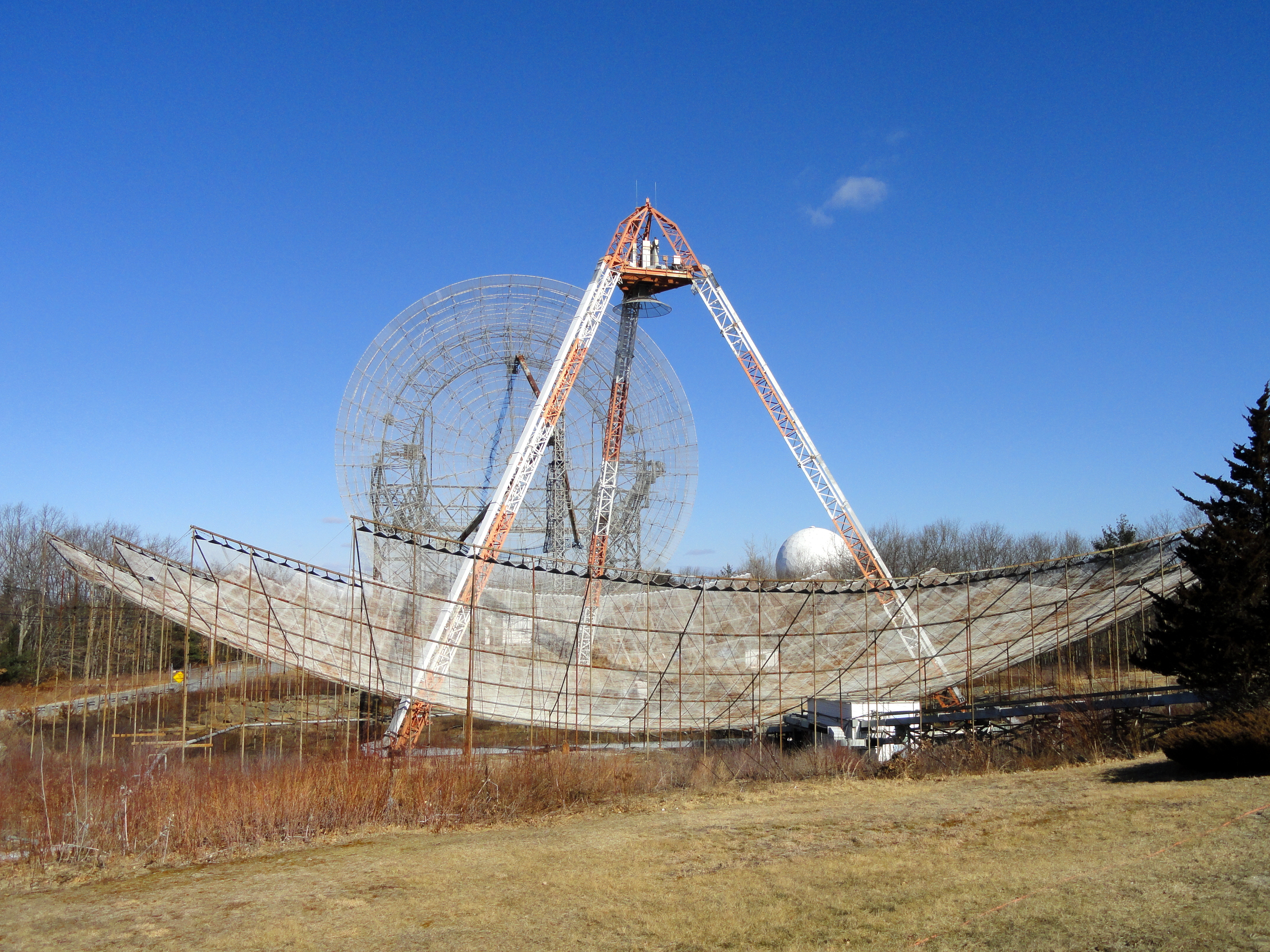
Millstone Hill Radar

The 37 m (121 ft) Haystack Radio Telescope is a parabolic antenna protected by a 46 m (151 ft) metal-frame radome. It is known as the Haystack Long-Range Imaging Radar (LRIR) or Haystack Ultrawideband Satellite Imaging Radar (HUSIR) when used for the LSSC. It was constructed for use in space tracking and communication, but now is used primarily for astronomy. It was completed in 1964 and originally observed at 8 GHz on the radio spectrum. Since then it has been upgraded to listen to other frequency bands, though not simultaneously. When used for radar it broadcasts and listens in bands at either 10 GHz or 95 GHz. The main dish was upgraded in 2006, which allowed operation at frequencies up to 150 GHz. The secondary reflector of the Cassegrain design features an active surface.

==== Haystack Radar operations ====
The Long-Range Imaging Radar (LRIR) system was originally designed to function as an X-band long-range imaging radar. In wideband mode, LRIR runs at 10 GHz with a 1.024 GHz bandwidth. The system was capable of sensitivity of 25 cm resolution, allowing for tracking and imaging satellites out to geostationary orbit distances, as well as deep space objects out to 40,000 km (130,000,000 ft) range. The radar was upgraded with a completely new antenna capable of dual-band operations, called Haystack Ultrawideband Satellite Imaging Radar (HUSIR). The system is capable of simultaneous operations in X band and W-band, which allows it to better determine the size, shape, orientation, and motion of orbiting objects. The HUSIR design allows for tracking object with 0.5 millidegree accuracy. The W-band operates between 92 and 100 GHz, with a bandwidth of 8 GHz. The system contributes data to the United States Space Surveillance Network (SSN).

=== Haystack Auxiliary Radar ===
The Haystack Auxiliary Radar (HAX) is Ku-band system with a 40 ft (12 m) dish antenna. It was constructed in 1993 to augment the LSSC imaging and data collections space debris. It contributes data to the SSN.

=== Westford Radio Telescope ===
The 18.3 m (60 ft) Westford Radio Telescope was built in 1961 by Lincoln Laboratory for Project West Ford as an X-band radar antenna. It is located approximately 1.2 kilometers (0.75 mi) south of the Haystack telescope along the same access road. The antenna is housed in a 28.4 m (93 ft) radome and has an elevation-azimuth mount. Since 1981, it has been used primarily for geodetic very long baseline interferometry (VLBI). By measuring the location of astronomical radio sources very accurately, geodetic VLBI techniques can be used to measure things such as changes in the axial tilt of the Earth.

=== Event Horizon Telescope ===
Haystack serves as a computational hub for the Event Horizon Telescope, an assemblage of radio telescopes around Earth that combine data for very-long-baseline interferometry (VLBI) to achieve angular resolution capable of imaging a supermassive black hole's event horizon. Data are transported on large hard drives from the observing telescopes to Haystack, where a cluster of about 800 CPUs run algorithms to produce black hole imagery. The computation has been termed a "silicon lens", as the data from each telescope is useless by itself and must be computationally combined to produce an image.

=== Former telescopes ===
- The Deuterium Array was a 25-element radio telescope array optimized to observe at 327 MHz, which is one of the emission lines of deuterium. Each element, or station, was itself a 25-element array of dipoles. The array operated from 2004 to 2006.

== Millstone Hill Geospace Facility ==
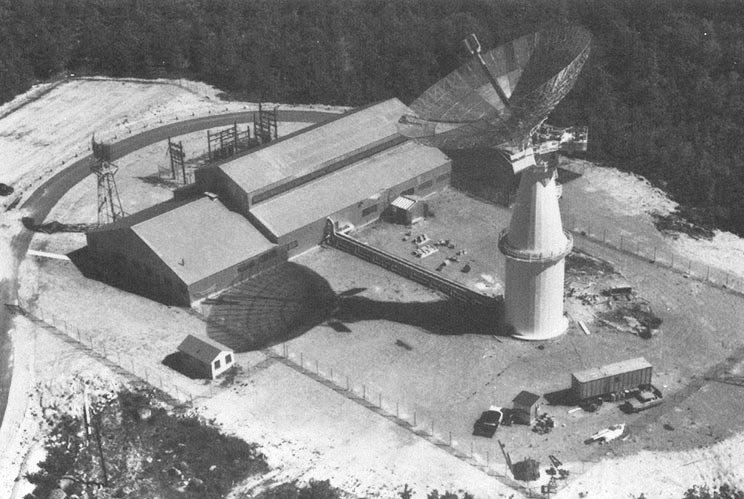
The Lincoln Laboratory Millstone Hill Radar Observatory, ca. 1958.

Millstone Hill Geospace Facility is a Massachusetts Institute of Technology atmospheric sciences research centre in Westford, Massachusetts, under primary support from the US National Science Foundation's Geospace Facilities section. It is part of Haystack Observatory, a multidisciplinary radio science observatory. Millstone Hill is the location for two of the most well-known incoherent scatter radars in the world. These include a fully steerable 46-meter antenna called Millstone Hill Steerable Antenna (MISA), and a 68-meter fixed zenith antenna. These radars are capable of measuring a vast array of ionospheric state variables, including electron density, plasma temperature, ion velocity, and ion composition. Data from Millstone Hill is publicly available on the MADRIGAL distributed database, an upper atmosphere data system managed by MIT Haystack.

=== Millstone Hill Steerable Antenna ===
The Millstone Hill Steerable Antenna (MISA) is a 46 m (151 ft) fully steerable UHF antenna. Built in 1963, the system was initially installed at the Sagamore Hill Air Force facility in Hamilton, Massachusetts, and was relocated as part of Millstone Hill at the Haystack Observatory complex in 1978. It is primarily used as an upper atmospheric radar observatory using incoherent scatter radar techniques.

=== Zenith Antenna ===
The 67 m (220 ft) Zenith antenna was constructed in 1963 to use with the UHF transmitter. The radar transmitter was previously connected to a steerable 84-foot antenna with a UHF horn feed. When the steerable 84' antenna was converted to a higher L-band frequency, the Zenith antenna was connected to the UHF transmitter and was dedicated exclusively to incoherent scatter radar observations of the mid-latitude ionosphere.

== Directors ==
Paul B. Sebring was the Haystack Observatory's director from 1970 to 1980. From 1980 to 1983 John V. Evans was the director. Joseph E. Salah was the director from 1983 to 2006, Alan R. Whitney was the interim director from 2006 to 2008. Colin J. Lonsdale was the director from 1 September 2008 to 31 December 2023. Philip J. Erickson became the new director on 1 January 2024.

== Exhibits ==
=== The Sun Drawing Exhibit ===
The Sun Drawing art exhibit at the Haystack Observatory was conceived and developed as part of the Global Sun Drawing Project by visual artist Janet Saad-Cook. "Sun Drawings" are projected images created by reflecting sunlight from a variety of materials that are strategically positioned to relate to their specific location on Earth. The reflections change shape and color in relation to the position of the Sun, creating a four-dimensional artwork of varying reflections throughout the day and year. Similar installations for the Global Sun Drawing Project have been planned at other astronomically significant locations worldwide, including an exhibit at the Karl G. Jansky Very Large Array in New Mexico.

== See also ==
- Sagamore Hill Radio Observatory
- List of astronomical observatories
- Knowing
- Project West Ford
