= Slang Faculae =

Faculae on Mercury

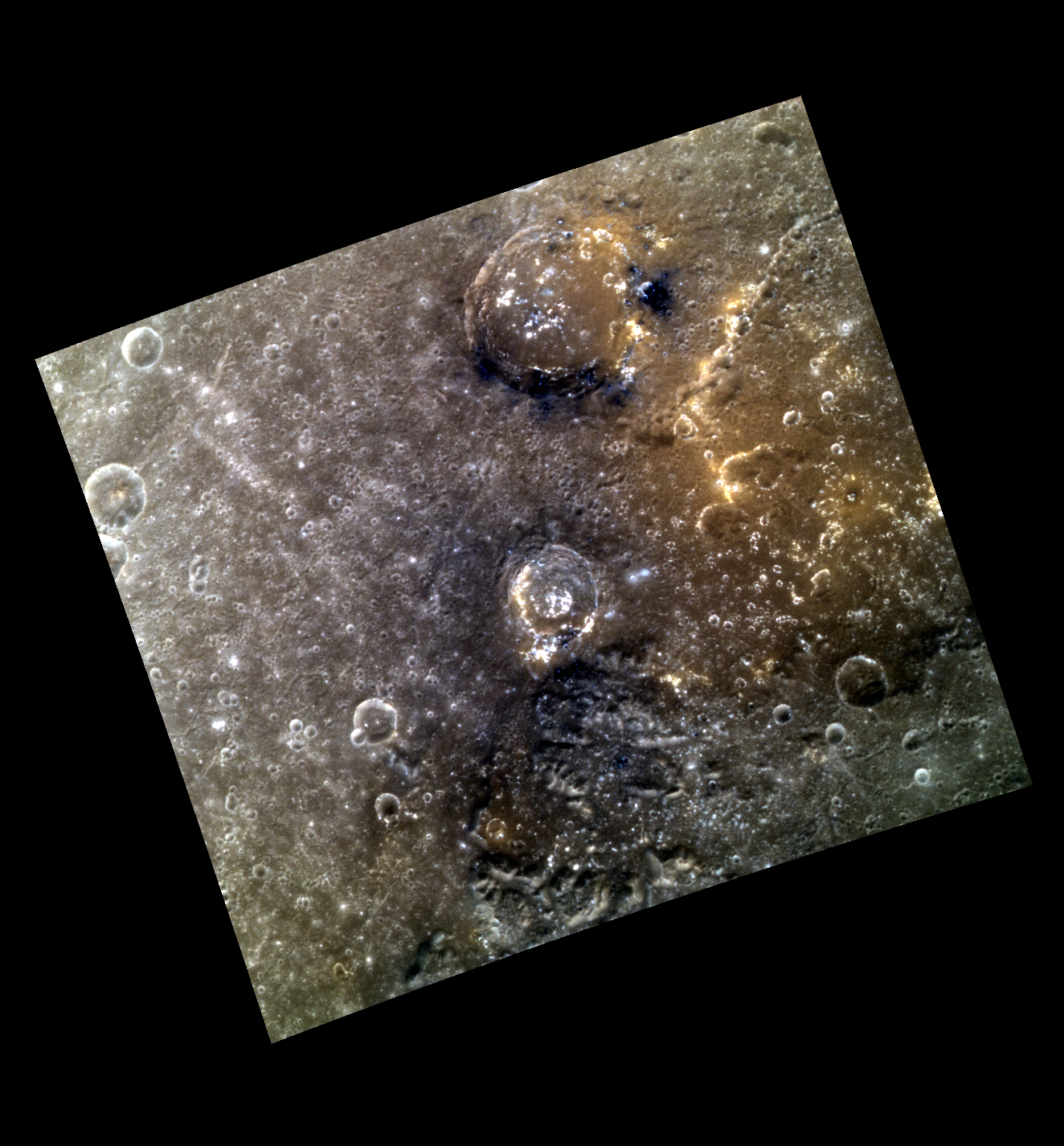
MESSENGER approximate color image

Slang Faculae is a bright region on the surface of Mercury, located at 24.5° N, 179.3° W. It was named by the IAU in 2018. Slang is the Afrikaans word for snake.

Slang Faculae lies on the southeast rim of the Caloris basin, east of Atget crater and south of March crater.
