= Hesiodus (crater) =

Crater on the Moon

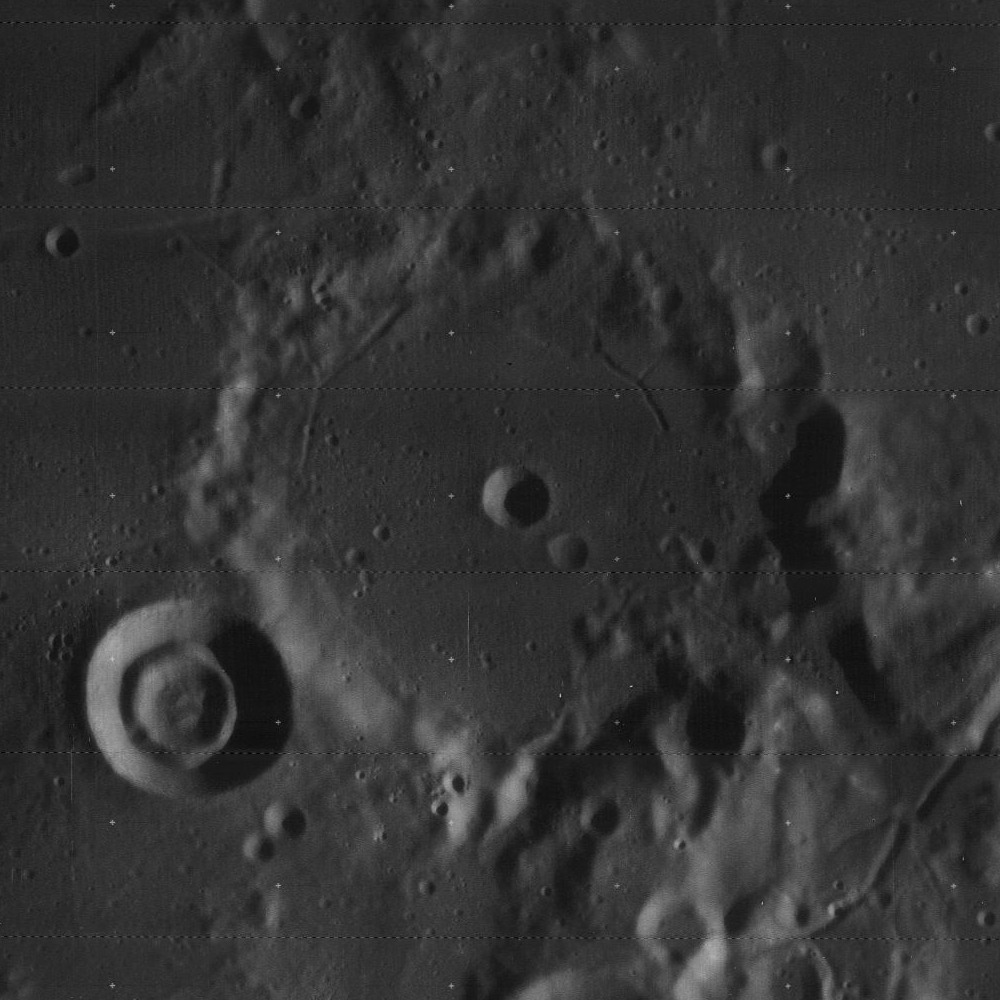
- Lunar Orbiter 4 image, with Hesiodus A at lower left
- Coordinates: 29.4°S 16.3°W
- Diameter: 43 km
- Depth: 0.45 km
- Colongitude: 16° at sunrise
- Eponym: Hesiod

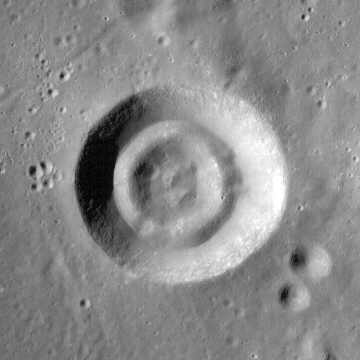
LRO image of Hesiodus A

Hesiodus is a lunar impact crater located on the southern fringes of Mare Nubium, to the northwest of the crater Pitatus. It was named after the ancient Greek poet Hesiod. Starting near the northwest rim of Hesiodus is the wide cleft named Rima Hesiodus. This rille runs 300 km east-southeastward to the Palus Epidemiarum

The low rim of Hesiodus is heavily worn, with the southwest rim being slightly intruded upon by Hesodius A. The latter is an unusual circular crater with a concentric inner wall. To the southeast, a cleft in the wall of Hesiodus joins the crater to Pitatus.

Inside Hesiodus, the floor is flooded and relatively flat. It lacks a central peak, and, instead, a small impact crater Hesiodus D lies at the middle.

== Satellite craters ==
By convention these features are identified on lunar maps by placing the letter on the side of the crater midpoint that is closest to Hesiodus.

Hesiodus	Latitude	Longitude	Diameter
A	30.1° S	17.0° W	15 km
B	27.1° S	17.5° W	10 km
D	29.3° S	16.4° W	5 km
E	27.8° S	15.3° W	3 km
X	27.3° S	16.2° W	24 km
Y	28.3° S	17.2° W	17 km
Z	28.7° S	19.4° W	4 km

== See also ==
- Hesiod (crater) - on Mercury
