= Nākahi Facula =

Facula on Mercury

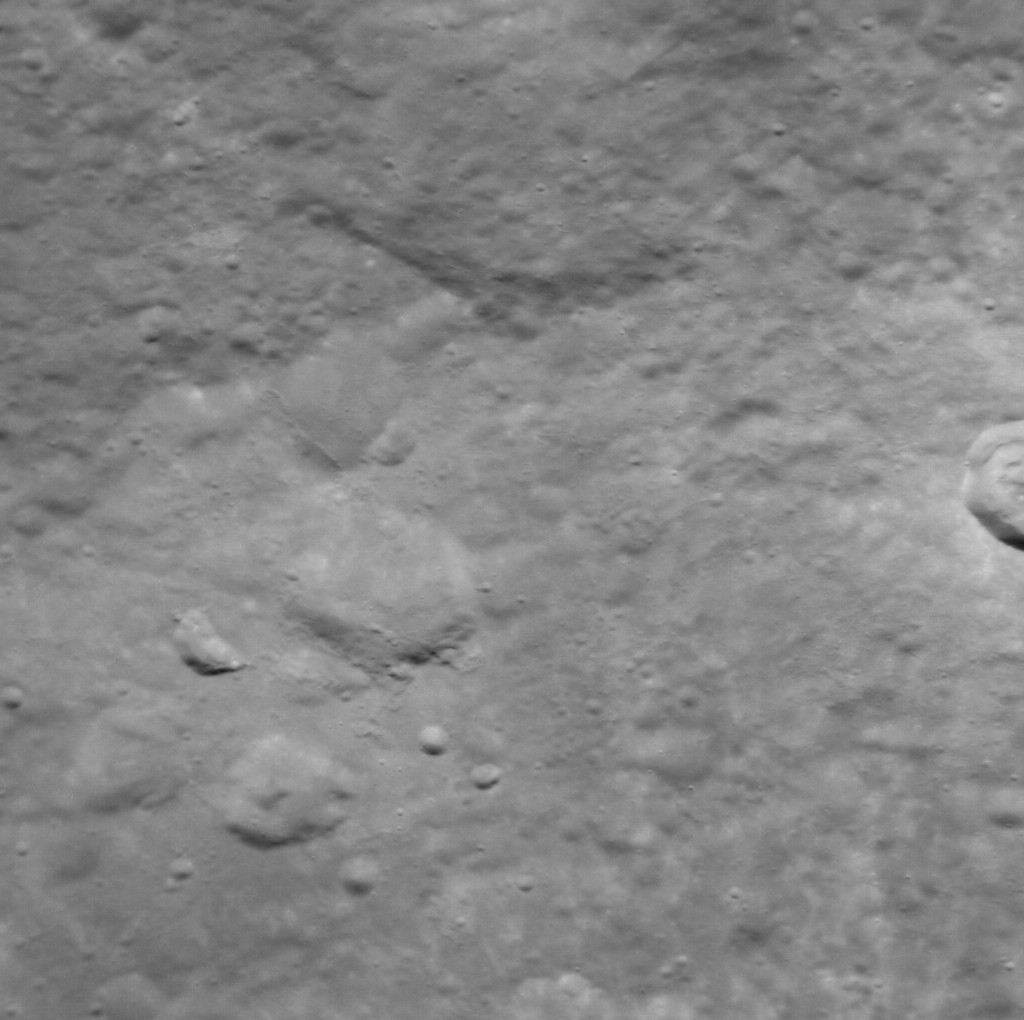
Oblique view of Nākahi Facula (left). MESSENGER NAC.

Nākahi Facula is a bright, irregular depression on the surface of Mercury, located at 52.7° S, 342.2° W. It was named by the IAU in 2018. Nākahi is the Māori word for snake.

Nākahi Facula is located southeast of Amaru Facula. The irregular depressions in both suggest they are probably volcanic vents.

Both faculae are in the Debussy quadrangle and are roughly south of Debussy crater.

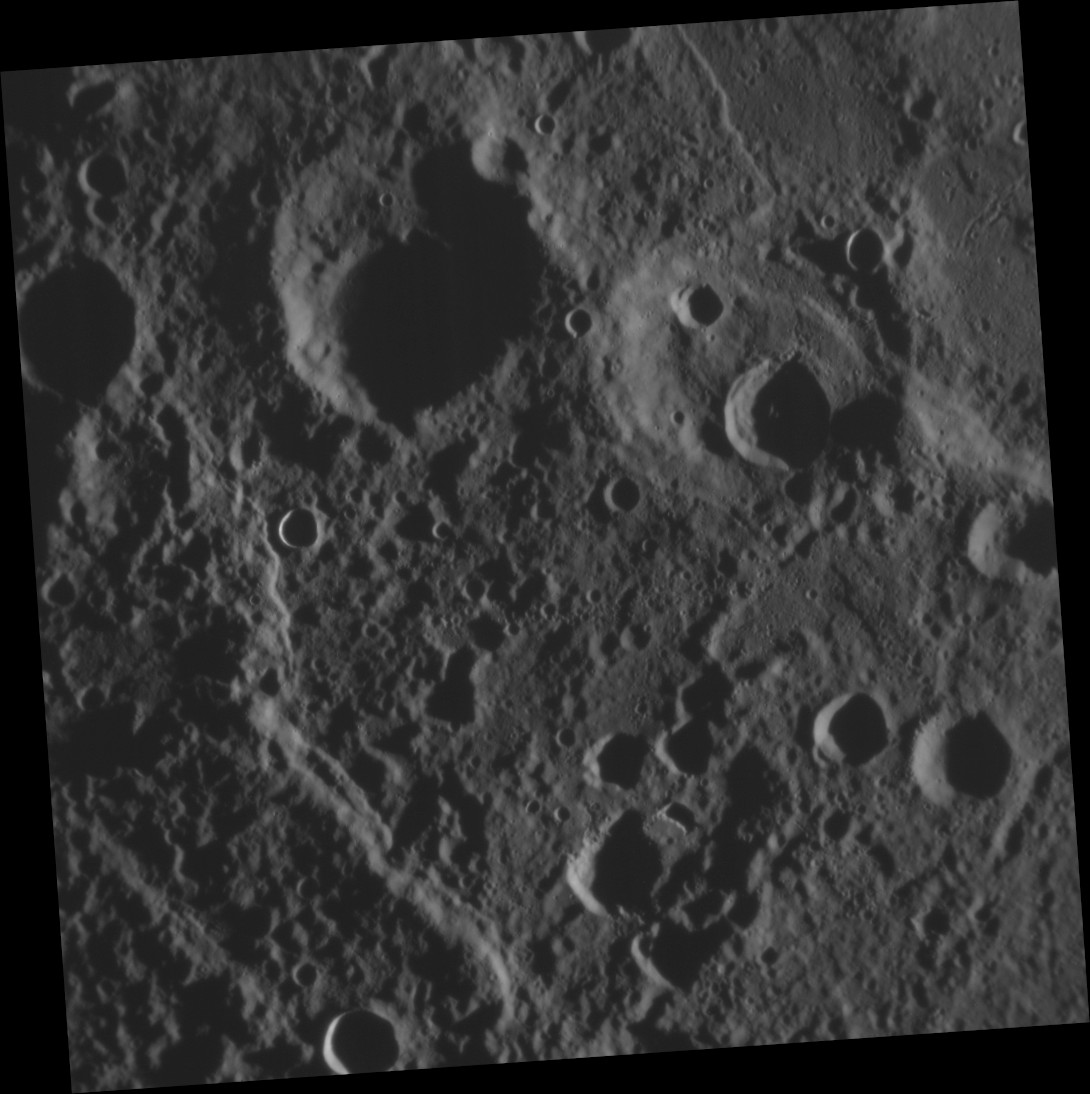
Another image at low sun angle, with facula near bottom center

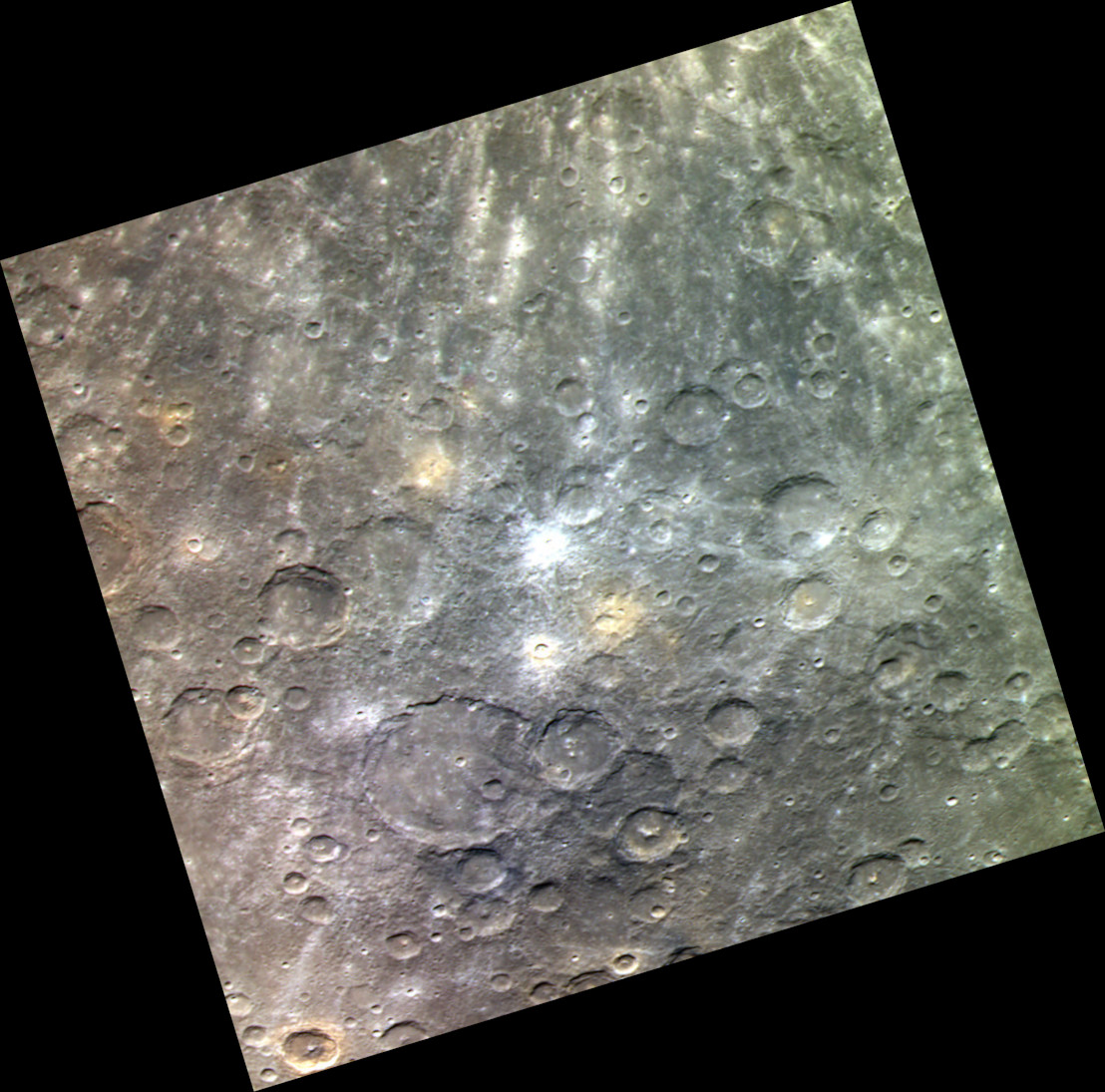
Approximate color image showing Amaru Facula (above left of center) and Nākahi Facula (below right of center), as yellowish spots.
