= Pahinui (crater) =

Crater on Mercury

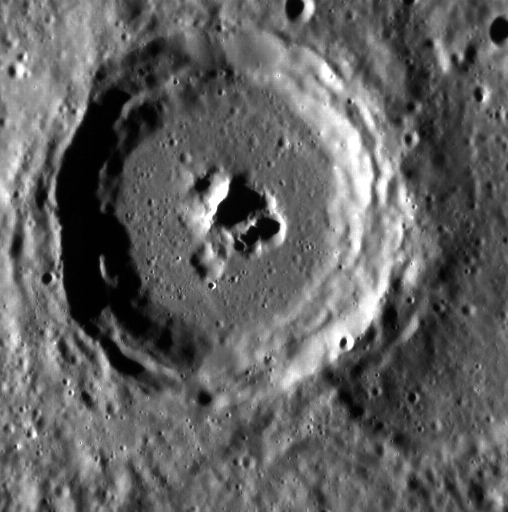
- MESSENGER image
- Planet: Mercury
- Coordinates: 28.16°S 213.21°W
- Quadrangle: Neruda
- Diameter: 54 km (34 mi)
- Eponym: Gabby Pahinui

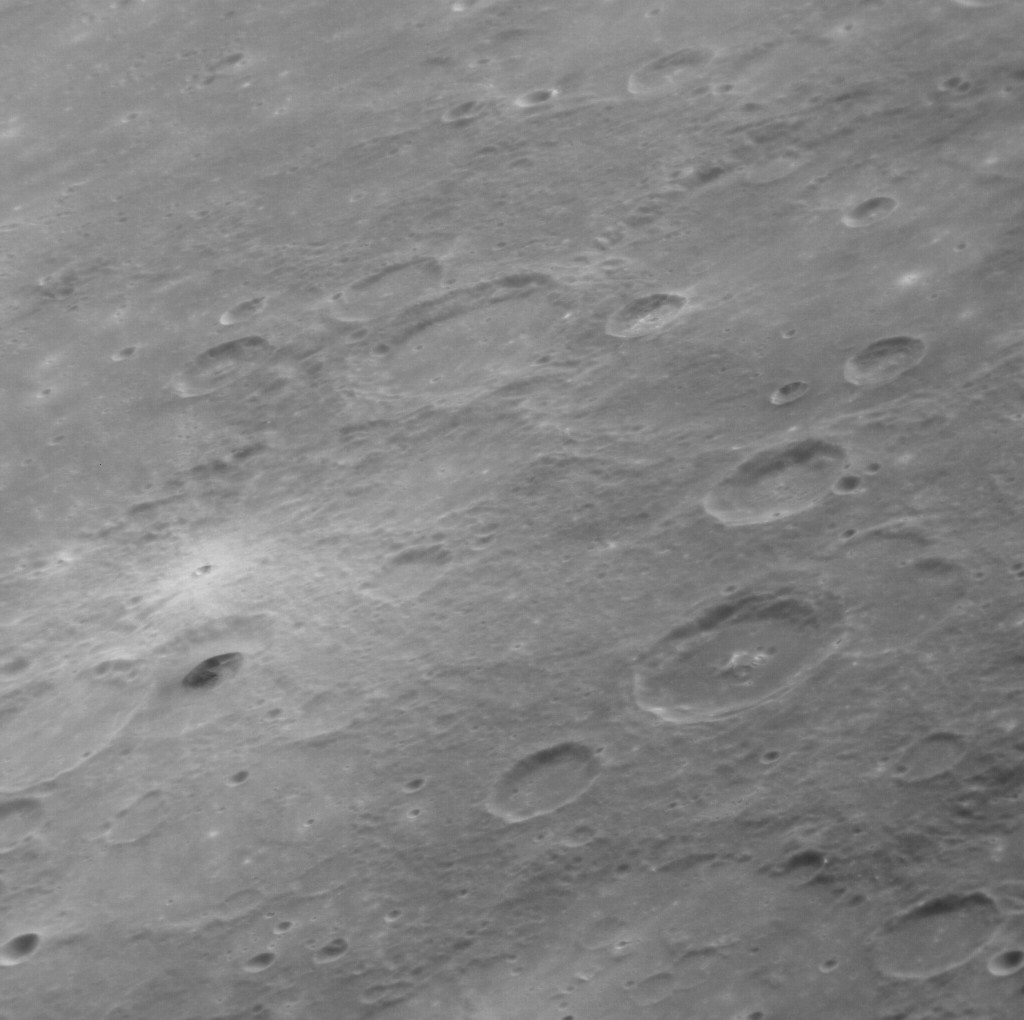
Oblique context image with Pahinui at lower right

Pahinui is a crater on Mercury. Its name was adopted by the International Astronomical Union in 2016, after the Hawaiian musician, Charles Phillip Kahahawai "Gabby" Pahinui.

There is a rimless, irregular depression in the center of Pahinui, making it a pit-floor crater. Such a feature may have resulted from the collapse of a magma chamber underlying the central part of the crater.

To the west of Pahinui is Coatl Facula, a bright area within an unnamed crater.
