= Amaru Facula =

Facula on Mercury

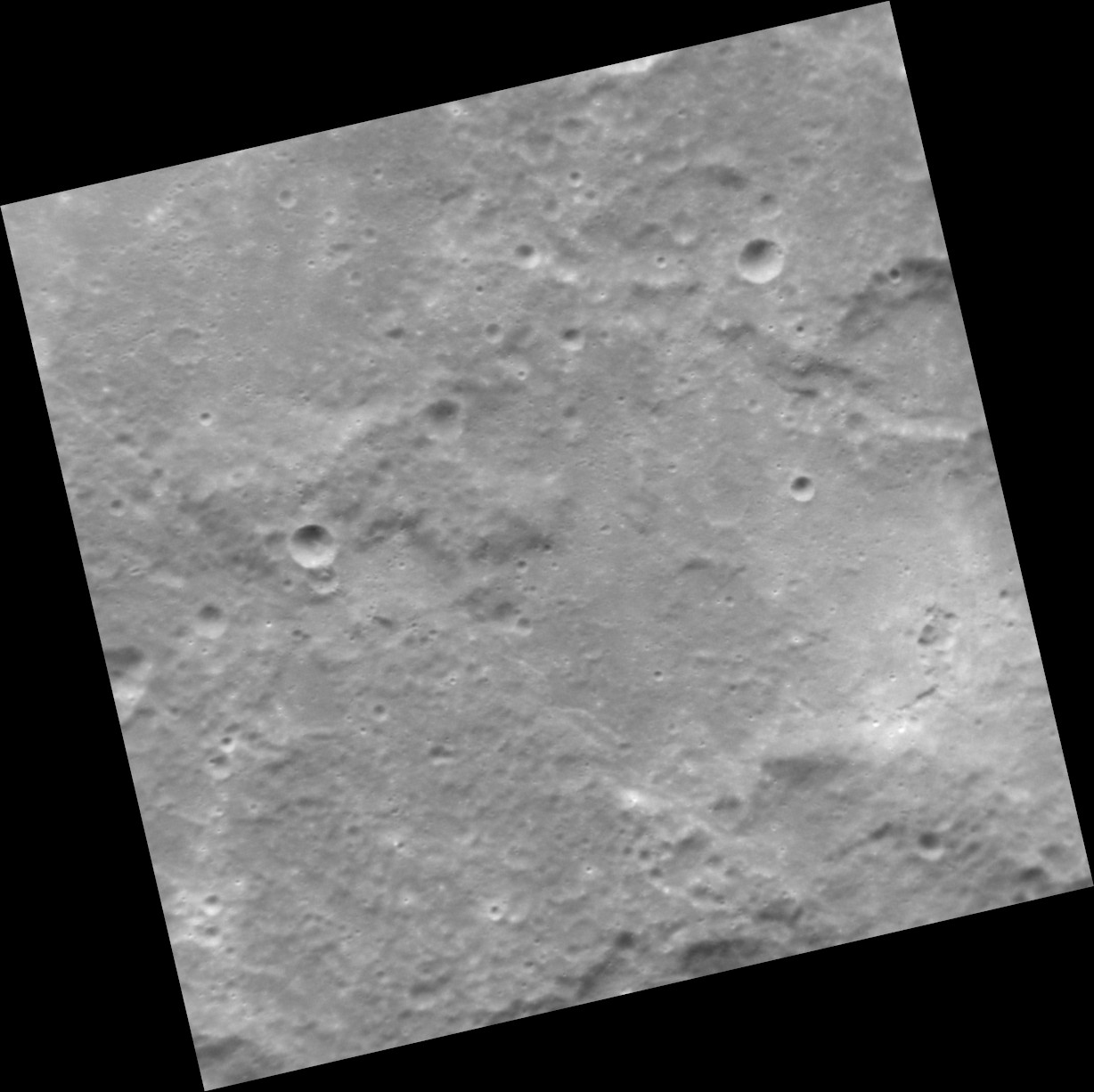
Amaru Facula in lower right. MESSENGER NAC.

Amaru Facula is a bright, irregular depression on the surface of Mercury, located at 49.8° S, 349.5° W. It was named by the IAU in 2018. Amaru is the Quechua word for snake.

Amaru Facula is located northwest of Nākahi Facula. The irregular depressions in both suggest they are probably volcanic vents.

Both faculae are in the Debussy quadrangle and are roughly south of Debussy crater.

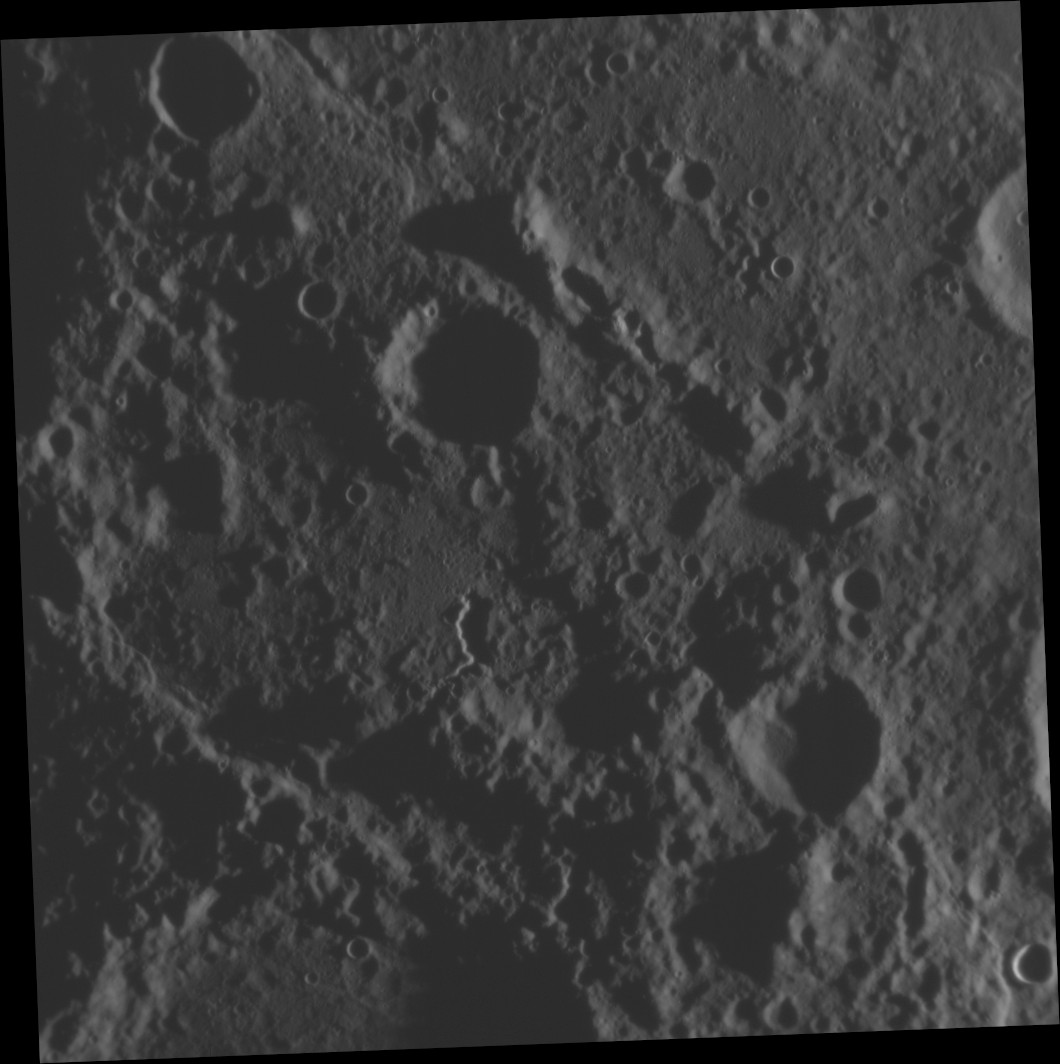
Another image at low sun angle, with the irregular depression of the facula near center

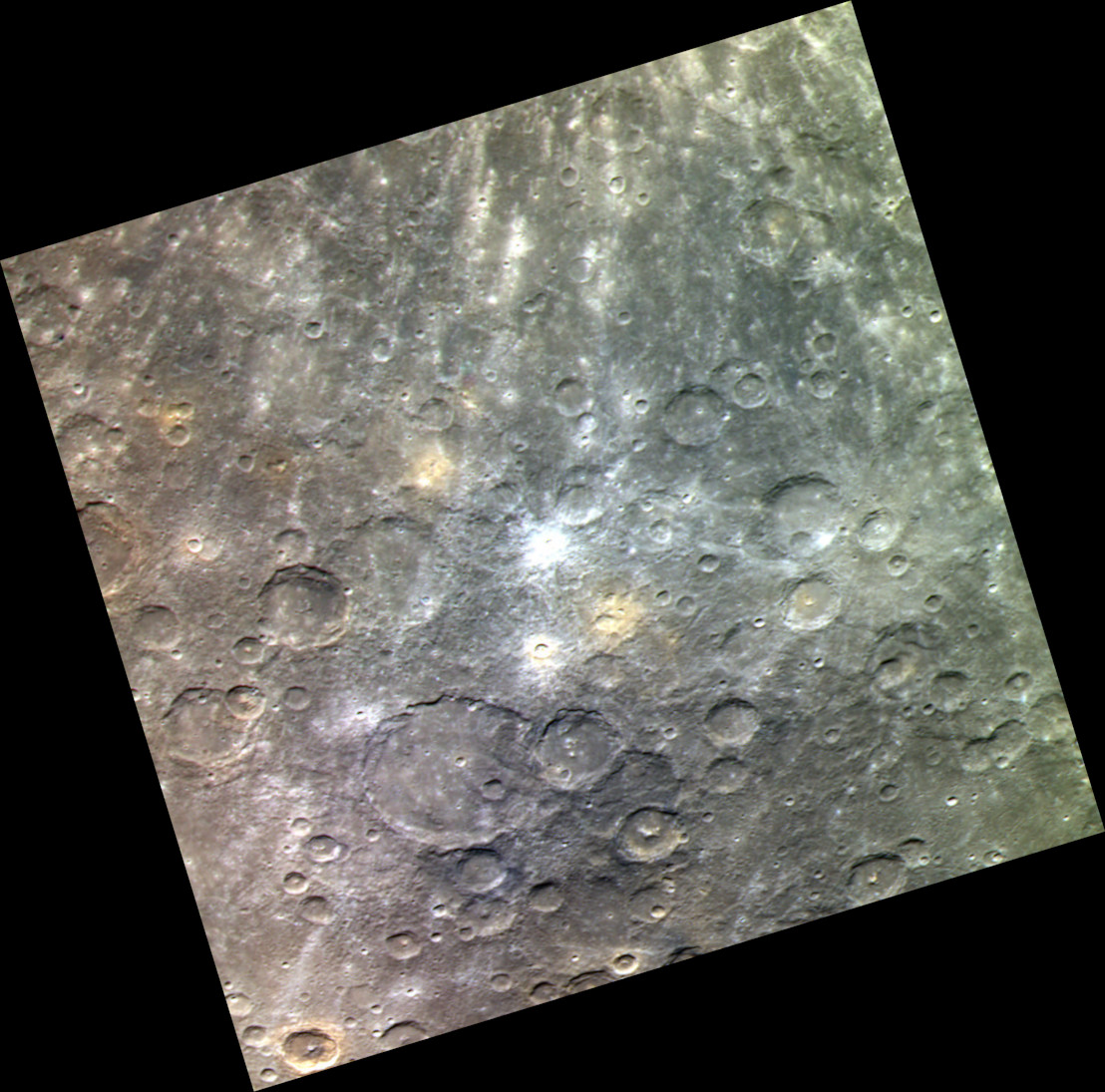
Approximate color image showing Amaru Facula (above left of center) and Nākahi Facula (below right of center), as yellowish spots.
