= Ular Facula =

Facula on Mercury

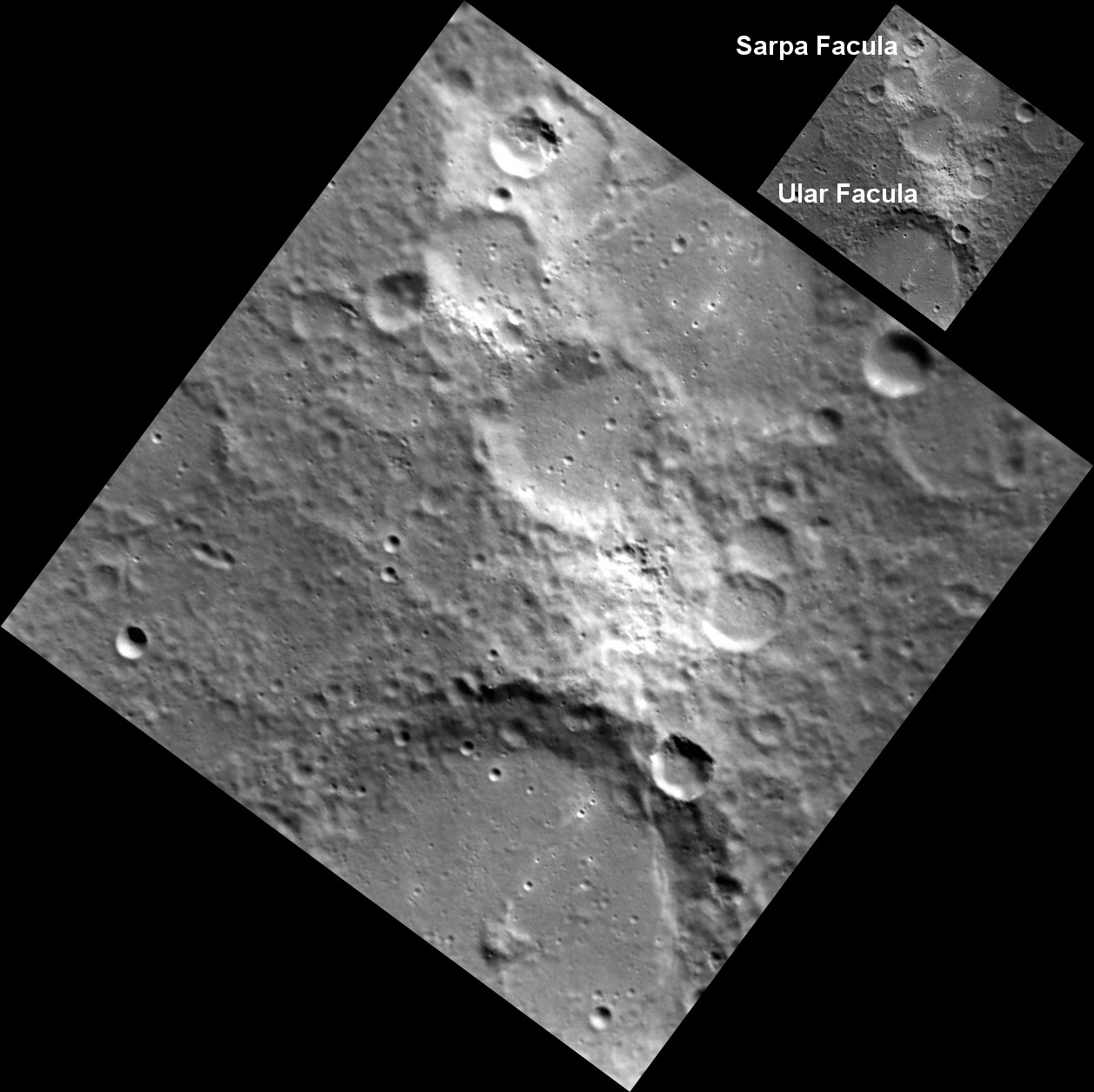
MESSENGER image

Ular Facula is a bright region on the surface of Mercury, located at 55.1° S, 29.95° W. It was named by the IAU in 2019. Ular is the Malay word for snake.

Ular Facula is south of Sarpa Facula. Both faculae are associated with irregular depressions near their centers. The combination of the presence of these pits with the bright halos around them lead to the interpretation of this feature as a site of explosive volcanism. Other faculae to the northeast (Havu Facula and Bitin Facula), and southwest (Pampu Facula) are also associated with irregular depressions and are likely volcanic.
