= Coatl Facula =

Bright region on the surface of Mercury

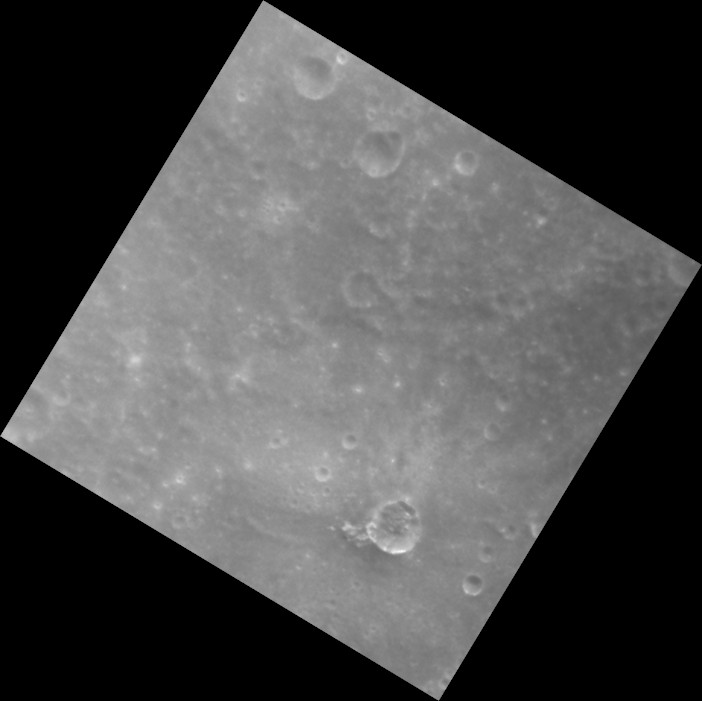
Coatl Facula is north of the sharp crater below center

Coatl Facula is a bright region about 49 km wide on the surface of Mercury, located at 29.75° S, 216.55° W. It was named by the IAU in June 2020. Coatl is the Aztec (Nahuatl) word for snake.

The facula appears to be associated with an unnamed, fresh crater of about 10 km diameter, although the pattern is not typical of ray systems such as that of Hokusai crater or Debussy crater. The crater cuts across a lobate scarp trending north.

Coatl Facula is located west of the crater Pahinui.

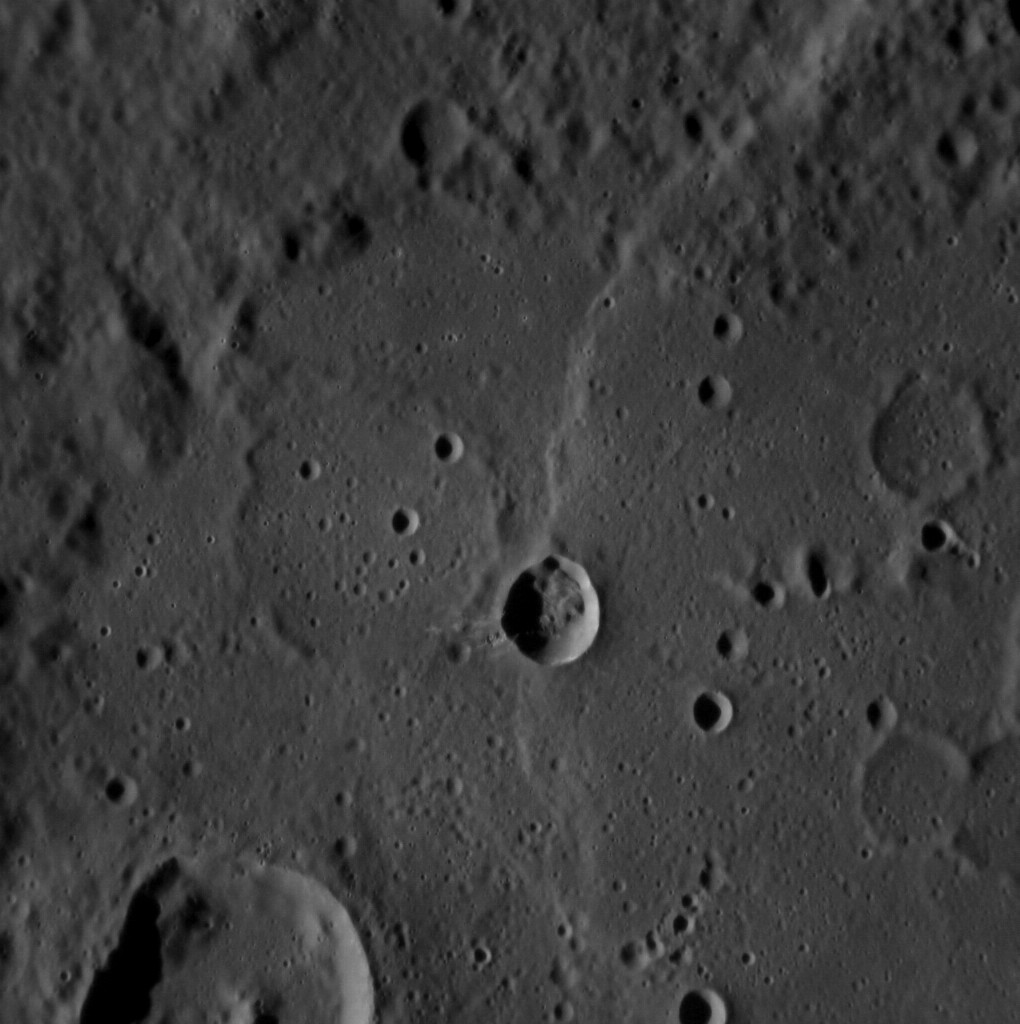
Coatl Facula at a low sun angle
