= Zapiola Rupes =

Escarpment on the planet of Mercury

- Feature type: Escarpment
- Location: Mercury
- Coordinates: 72°22′N 44°01′W
- Diameter: 89 km (55 mi)
- Naming: 2 December 2022
- Eponym: Zapiola, an Argentine ship

Zapiola Rupes is an escarpment on Mercury. The escarpment was named after Zapiola, the eponymous Argentine ship that was involved in oceanographic surveys in the southwestern Atlantic; and performed ten oceanographic cruises between 1962 and 1976. The name "Zapiola Rupes" was officially approved by the International Astronomical Union (IAU) on 2 December 2022.

== Geology and characteristics ==
Its coordinates are 72°22′N 44°01′W, and it has a diameter of 89 kilometres (55 mi).
