= Haystack Catena =

Catena on Mercury

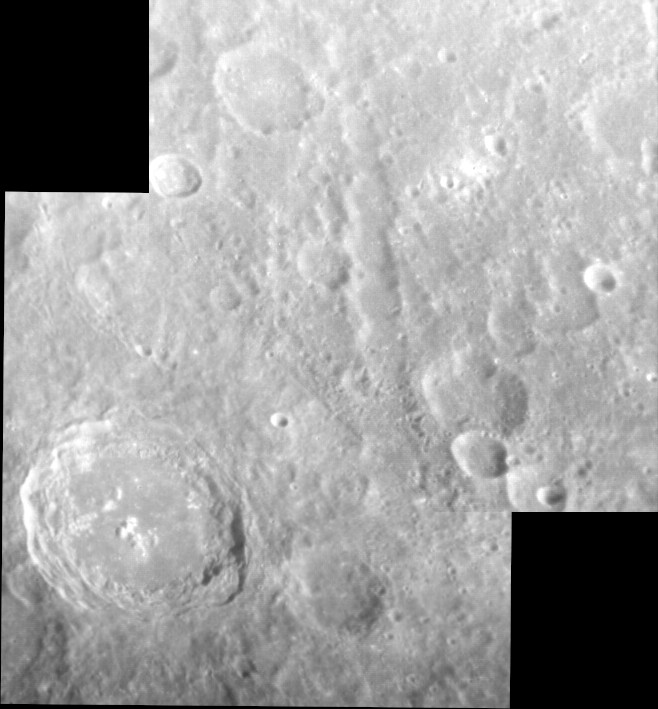
- Oblique MESSENGER NAC mosaic
- Feature type: Catena
- Coordinates: 4.42°N 46.48°W
- Eponym: Haystack Observatory

Haystack Catena is a catena on Mercury. It superficially resembles a graben but is a chain of overlapping secondary craters. It is named after Haystack Observatory, and was originally named Haystack Vallis when it was imaged by Mariner 10 in 1974, but the name was changed on 26 March 2013 to align with planetary feature naming themes. It is approximately 274 km long. It is located near the center of the Kuiper quadrangle, and it is radial to a large, unnamed crater that is Tolstojan in age.

To the southwest of the catena is a large (50 km diameter), unnamed crater of Kuiperian age.
