= Nervo (crater) =

Crater on Mercury

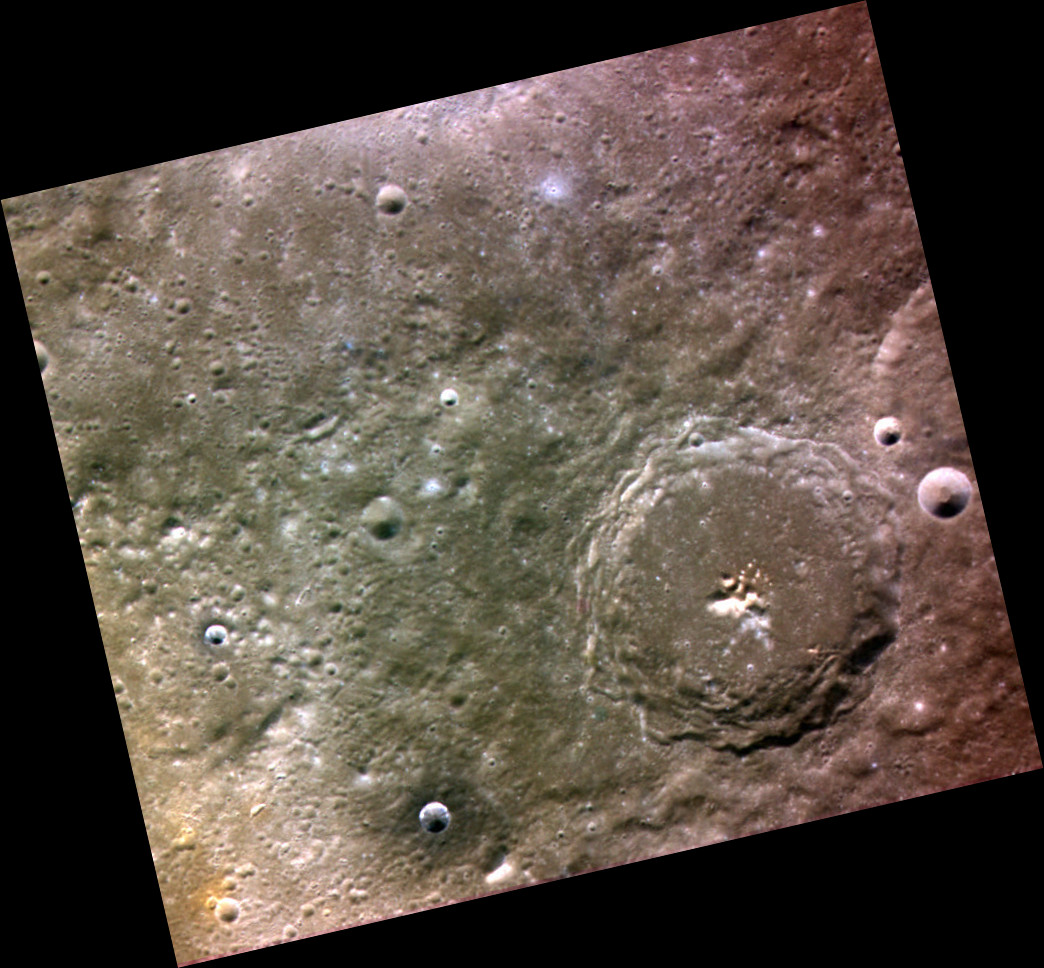
- Approximate color MESSENGER image with Nervo below right
- Feature type: Impact crater
- Location: Shakespeare quadrangle, Mercury
- Coordinates: 42.70°N 179.89°W
- Diameter: 66 km (41 mi)
- Eponym: Amado Nervo

Nervo is a crater on Mercury. Its name was adopted by the International Astronomical Union in 1979. Nervo is named for the Mexican poet Amado Nervo, who lived from 1870 to 1919. The crater was first imaged by Mariner 10 in 1974.

Hollows are present on and near the central peak of Nervo.

To the east of Nervo are linear ridges trending radially from the Caloris basin, believed to be ejecta from the Caloris impact event, similar to Imbrium sculpture on the Moon.

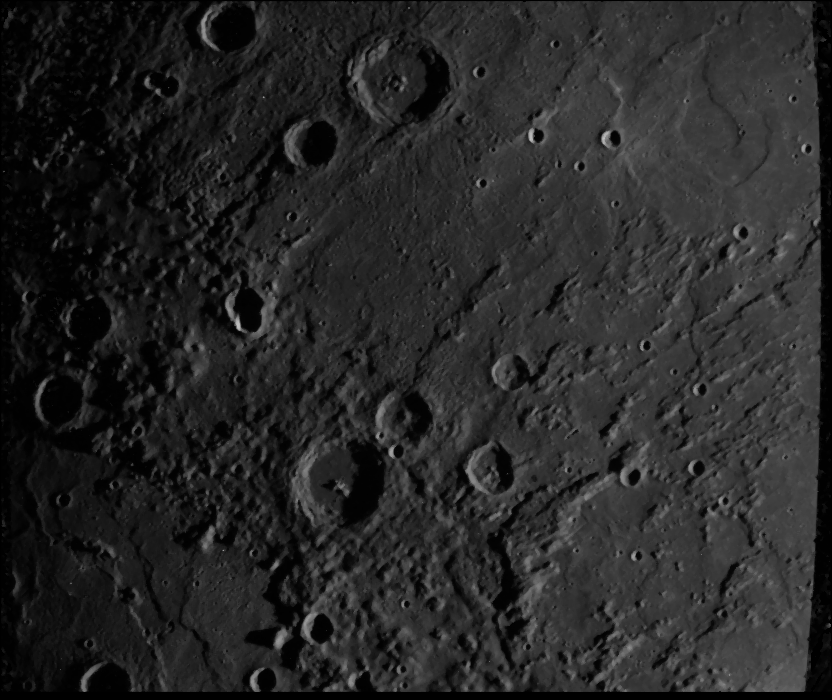
Mariner 10 image with Nervo below center

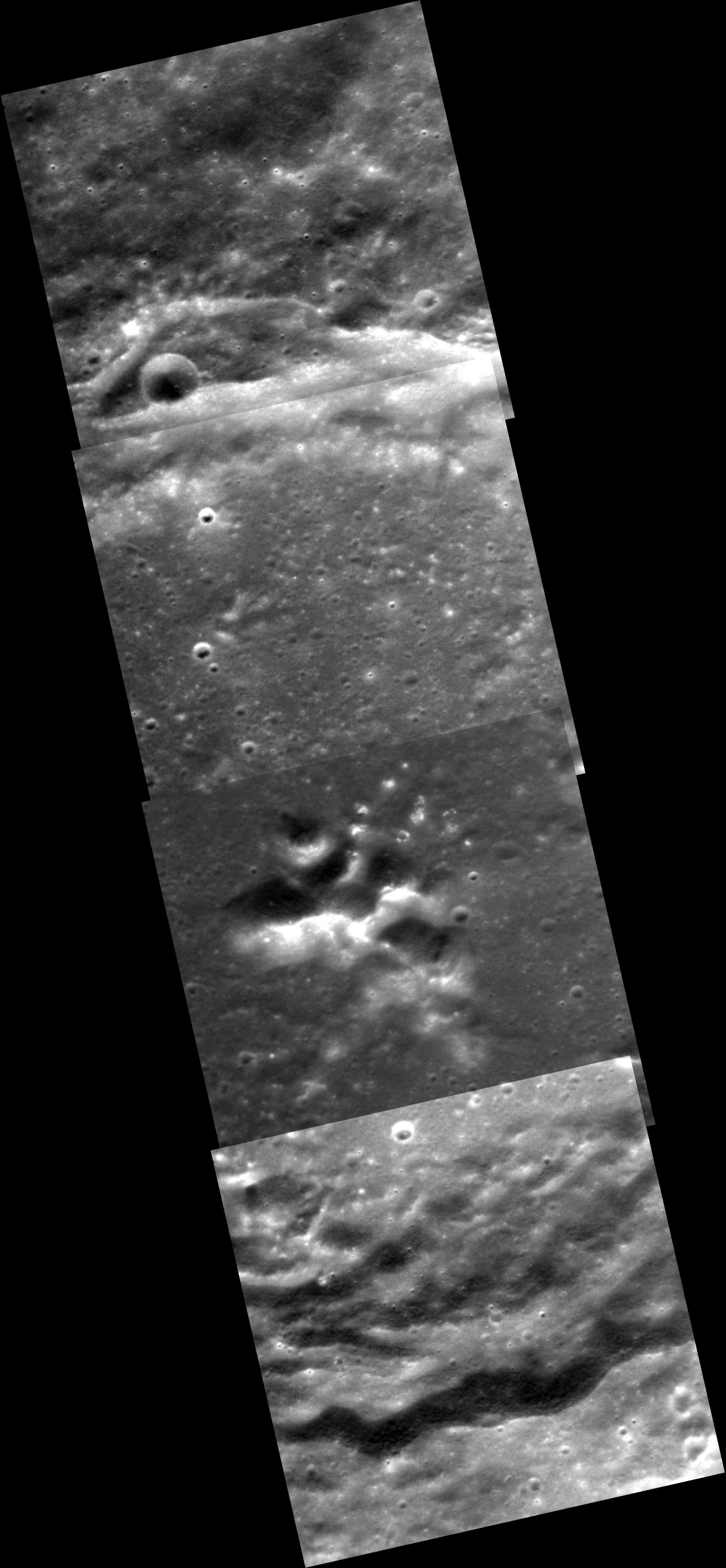
MESSENGER NAC Mosaic of central Nervo
