= Zapiola =

Zapiola is a surname. Notable people with the surname include:

- Franco Zapiola (born 2001), Argentine footballer
- José Zapiola (1802–1885), Chilean musician, composer, and orchestra conductor
- José Matías Zapiola (1780–1874), Argentine brigadier
