= John V. Evans (astronomer) =

British-American radio astronomer (born 1933)

John Evans
- Born: 5 July 1933 (age 93); Manchester, England
- Education: University of Manchester (PhD)

John V. Evans (born 5 July 1933) is a British-American radio astronomer born in Manchester, England. He obtained his PhD at the University of Manchester, and has been a professor at the Lincoln Laboratory of the Massachusetts Institute of Technology since 1960.

In 1975, Evans received the Appleton Prize.

Evans showed how long-period lunar echo fading could be used to measure ionospheric electron density. William Smith used Long Michelson interferometer observations of sources to do the same. He also demonstrated that lunar scattering was limb-darkened. With G. N. Taylor, he bounced radar echoes off Venus in September 1959. He has performed radar studies of the Moon, Venus, etc. He also worked on detecting Sputnik 1 with the Jodrell Bank. He co-authored the classic textbook Radar Astronomy with T. Hagfors.

In 1984, Evans was elected as a member of the National Academy of Engineering for the development of remote sensing technology which has given us a new understanding of the earth's upper atmosphere and the atmospheres of other planets.
