= March (crater) =

Crater on Mercury

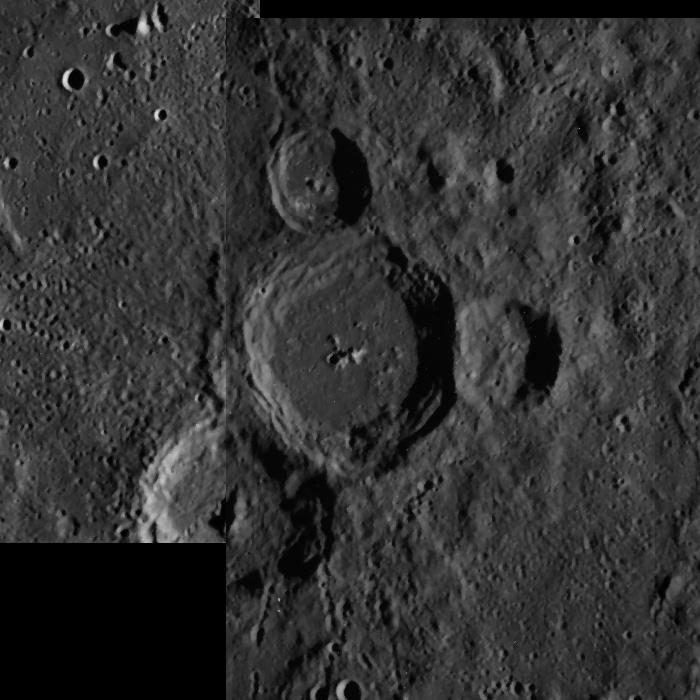
- March (center); Mosaic of Mariner 10 images
- Feature type: Central-peak impact crater
- Location: Shakespeare quadrangle, Mercury
- Coordinates: 30.95°N 176.3°W
- Diameter: 83 km (52 mi)
- Eponym: Ausias March

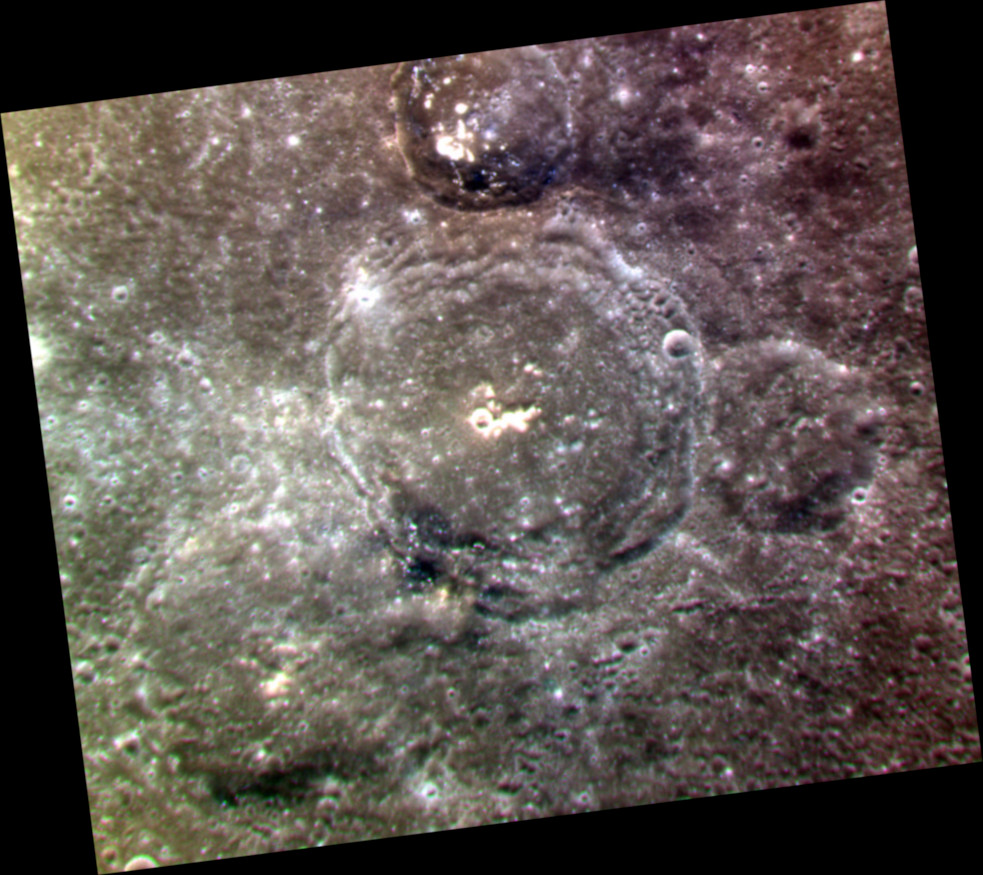
Approximate color MESSENGER WAC image

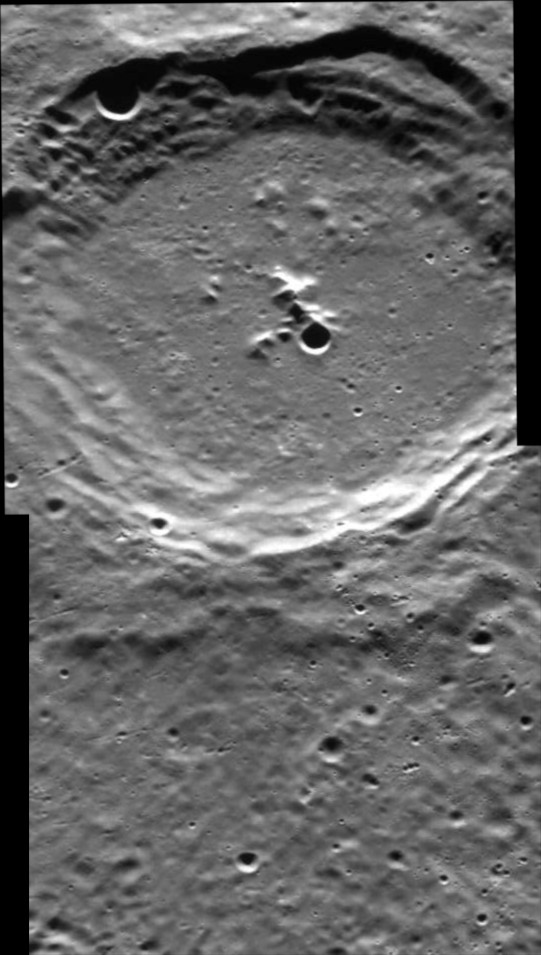
Oblique view of March crater

March is a crater on Mercury. Its name was adopted by the International Astronomical Union in 1979. March is named for the Valencian poet in Catalan language Ausias March, who lived from 1397 to 1459.

At the time of the Mariner 10 mission in 1974 and 1975, March and the three craters surrounding it were informally called the Teddy Bear.

March lies on the east rim of the Caloris basin.
