= Hesiod (crater) =

Crater on Mercury

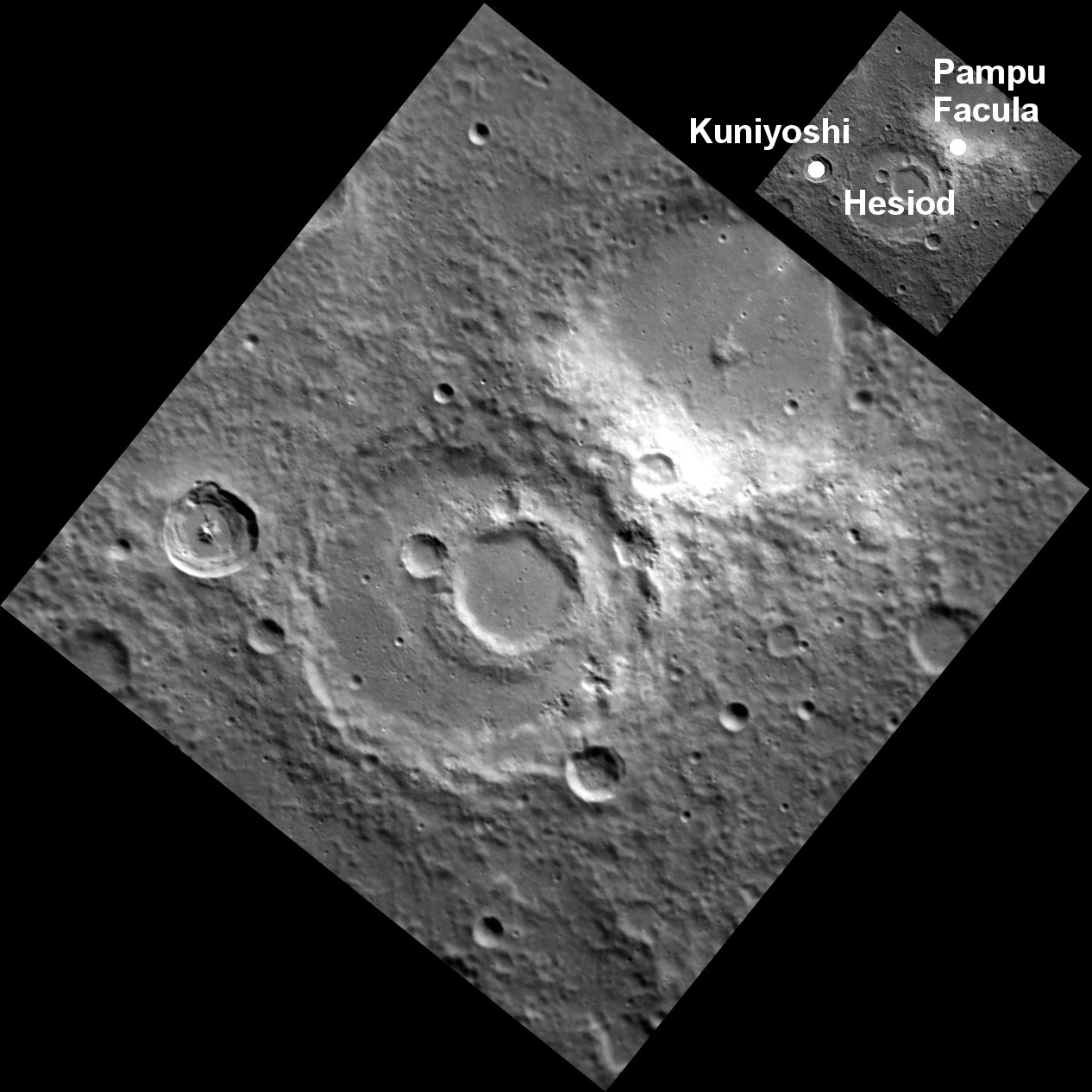
- MESSENGER image of Hesiod
- Feature type: Impact crater
- Location: Discovery quadrangle, Mercury
- Coordinates: 58.27°S 34.25°W
- Diameter: 101 km (63 mi)
- Eponym: Hesiod

Hesiod is a crater on Mercury. It has a diameter of 101 kilometers. Its name was adopted by the International Astronomical Union (IAU) in 1976. Hesiod is named for the Ancient Greek poet Hesiod, who lived around 800 BCE.

Irregular depressions are present within Hesiod and on the north rim of nearby Kuniyoshi crater. Pampu Facula is centered on its northeastern rim of Hesiod, which also has an irregular depression at its center. The combination of the presence of irregular pits with the bright halos around them support interpretation of the facula as a site of explosive volcanism. The irregular pits in Hesiod and Kuniyoshi may also be volcanic although they lack bright halos.
