= Debussy (crater) =

Crater on Mercury

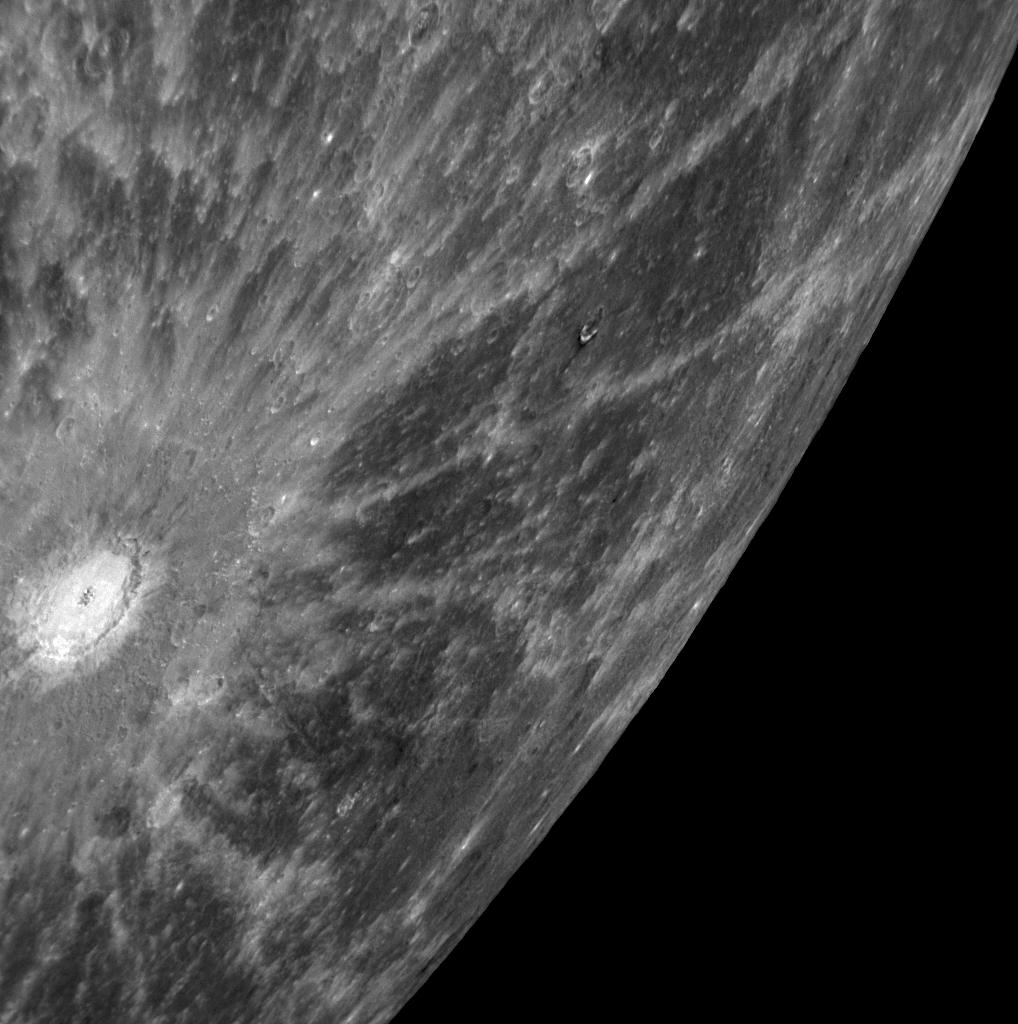
- Debussy crater, from MESSENGER's second flyby in October 2008
- Feature type: Impact crater
- Location: Debussy quadrangle, Mercury
- Coordinates: 33.9°S 347.5°W
- Diameter: 85 km (53 mi)
- Eponym: Claude Debussy

Debussy is a rayed impact crater on Mercury, which was discovered in 1969 by low resolution ground-based radar observations obtained by the Goldstone Observatory. Later in 1990–2005 it was imaged in more detail by the Arecibo Observatory. The crater was initially known as the feature A. The bright appearance of rays in the radar images indicates that the crater is geologically young, because fresh and rough surfaces of young impact craters are good scatterers of radio waves.

Debussy is named after Claude Debussy (1862–1918), one of the most important French composers, who worked in the field of the impressionist music. It has a diameter of about 85 km, while the rays extend hundreds of kilometers, covering much of the southern hemisphere. The ray system of Debussy is the second most prominent on Mercury after that of Hokusai. Debussy is the only named feature within the plain of Turms Planitia.

This crater is a prominent feature in the first photograph taken from Mercury orbit, taken on March 29, 2011 by the MESSENGER spacecraft, pictured below.

Debussy is the fifth-largest crater of the Kuiperian system on Mercury. The largest is Bartók crater, and it is only slightly smaller than the aforementioned Hokusai crater.

== Views ==
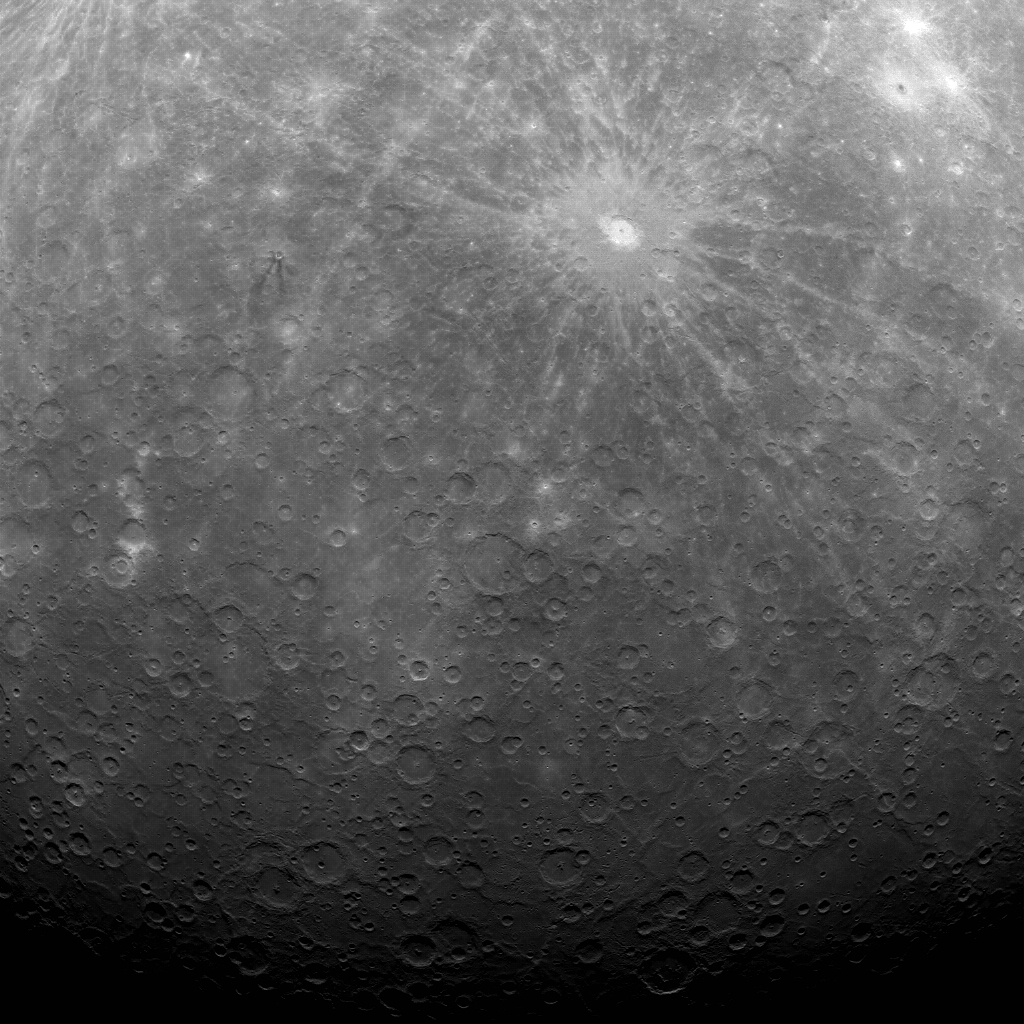
First ever photograph from Mercury orbit with Debussy near top

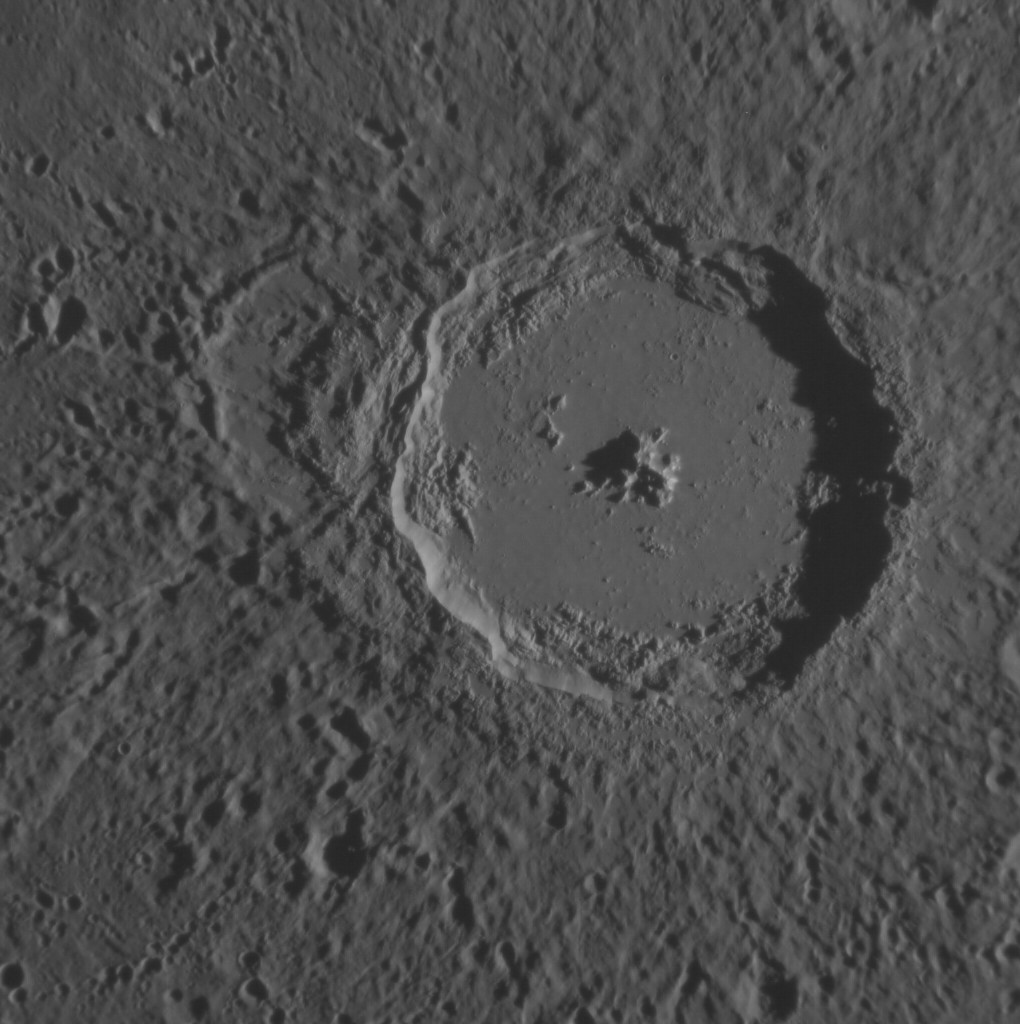
Debussy crater at a high incidence angle (79.3)

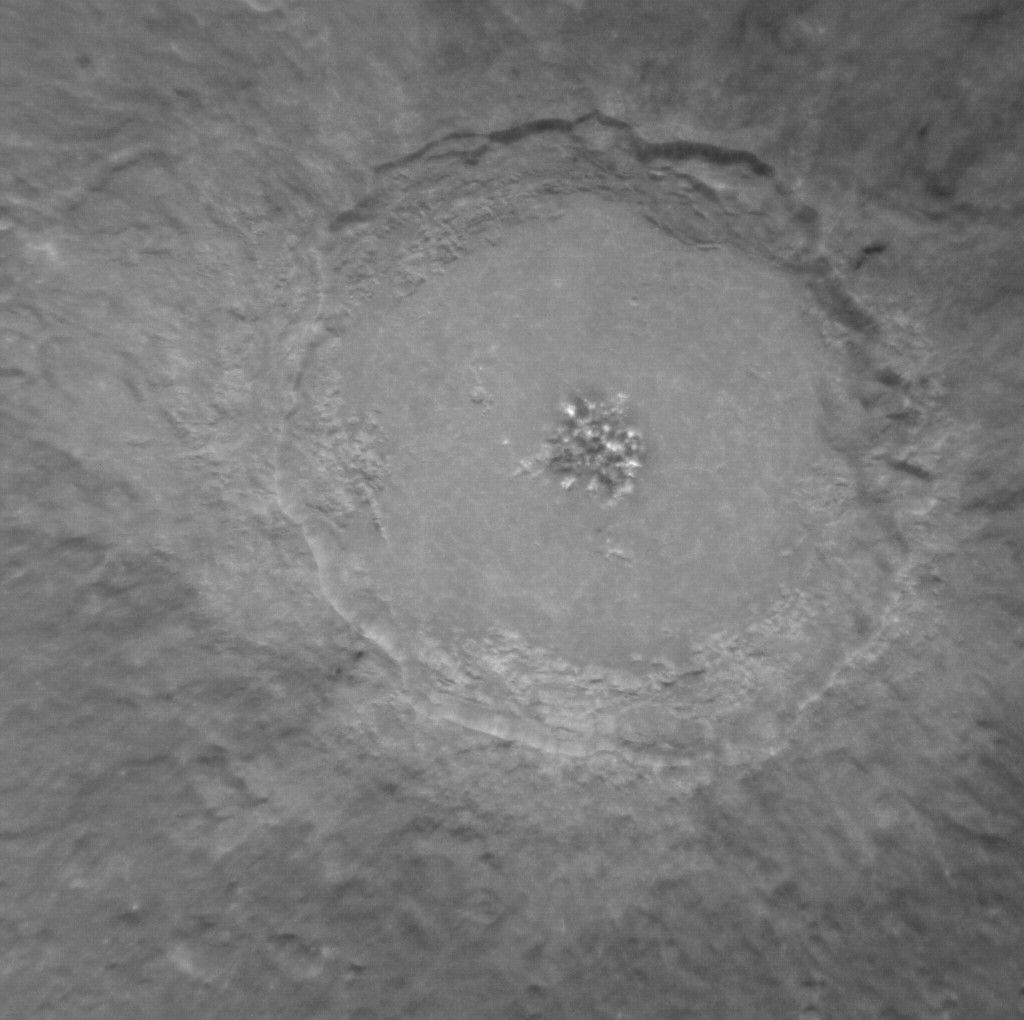
Debussy crater at a low incidence angle (34.4)

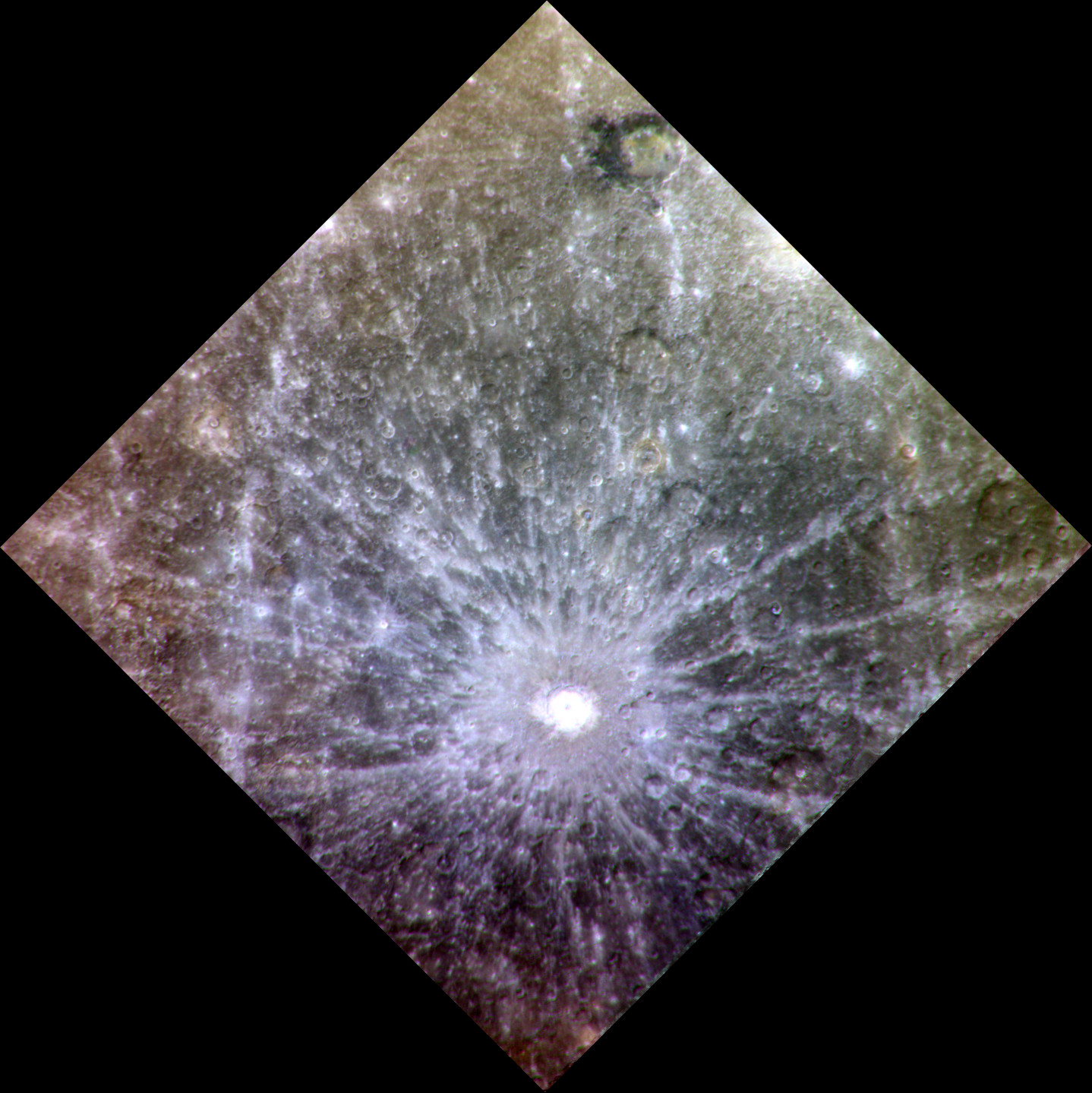
Regional view in exaggerated color
