= Pampu Facula =

Facula on Mercury

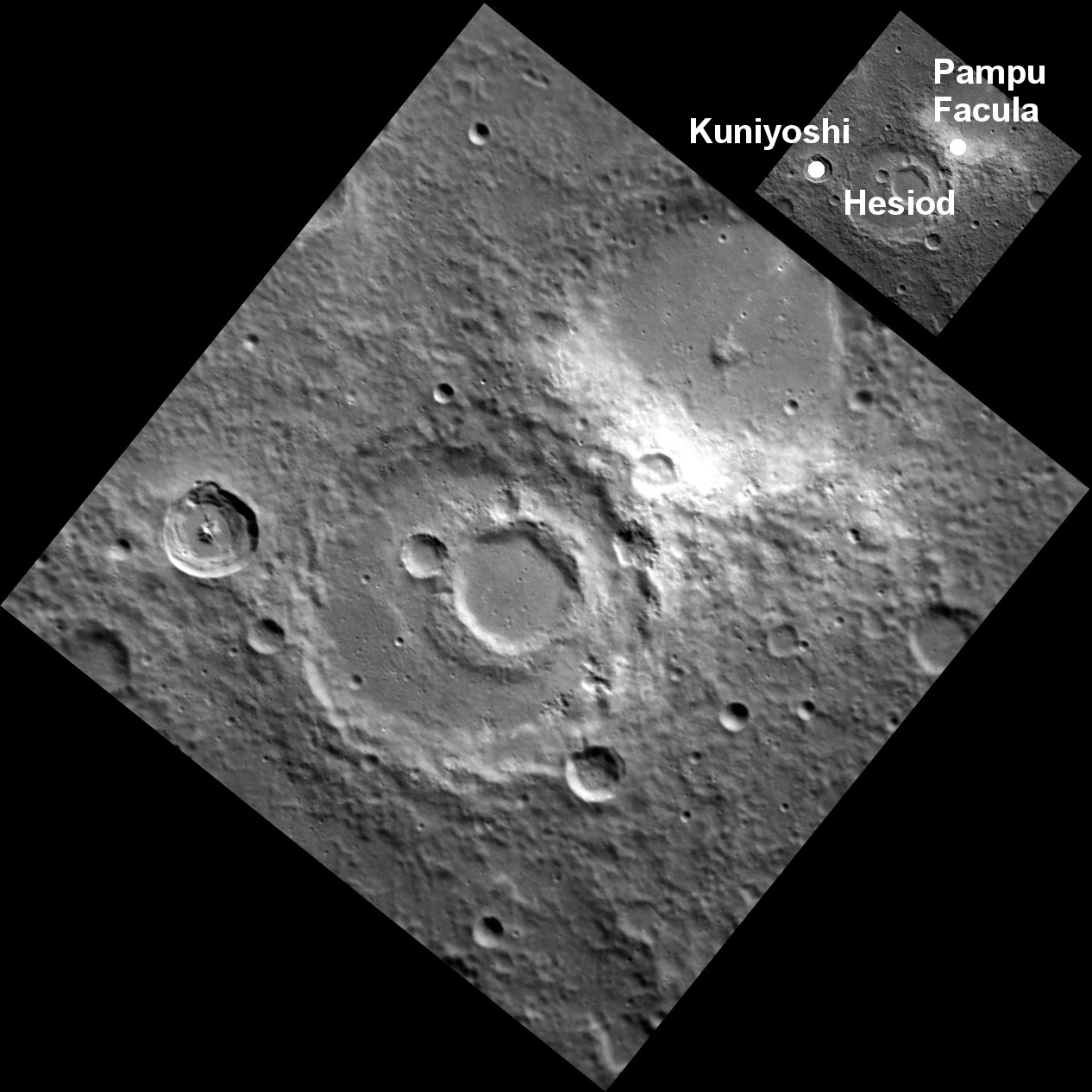
MESSENGER image

Pampu Facula is a bright region on the surface of Mercury, located at 57.76° S, 31.79° W. It was named by the IAU in 2019. Pampu is the Tamil word for snake.

This facula is associated with an irregular depression near the center (on the northeastern rim of Hesiod crater). The combination of the presence of this pit with the bright halo around it led to the interpretation of this feature as a site of explosive volcanism. Irregular pits are present within Hesiod but are less clearly associated with bright deposits. Other faculae to the northeast are also associated with irregular depressions and are likely volcanic.
