= Utaridi Planitia =

Geologic basin on Mercury

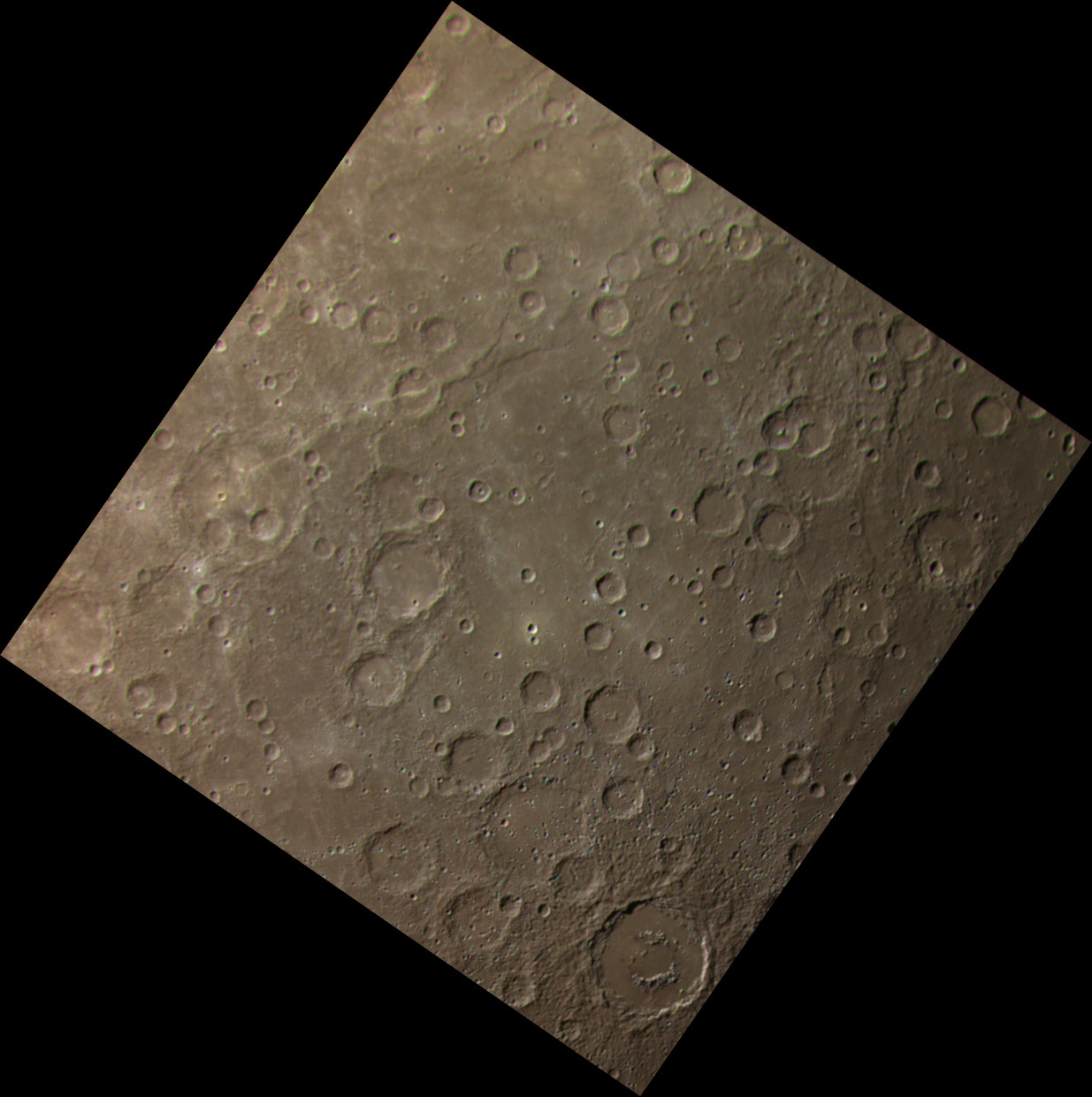
- Exaggerated color image with northern Utaridi Planitia near center
- Feature type: Planitia
- Location: Debussy, Bach, and Neruda quadrangles; Mercury
- Coordinates: 65.5°S 270.17°W
- Diameter: 930 km (580 mi)
- Eponym: Swahili word for the planet Mercury

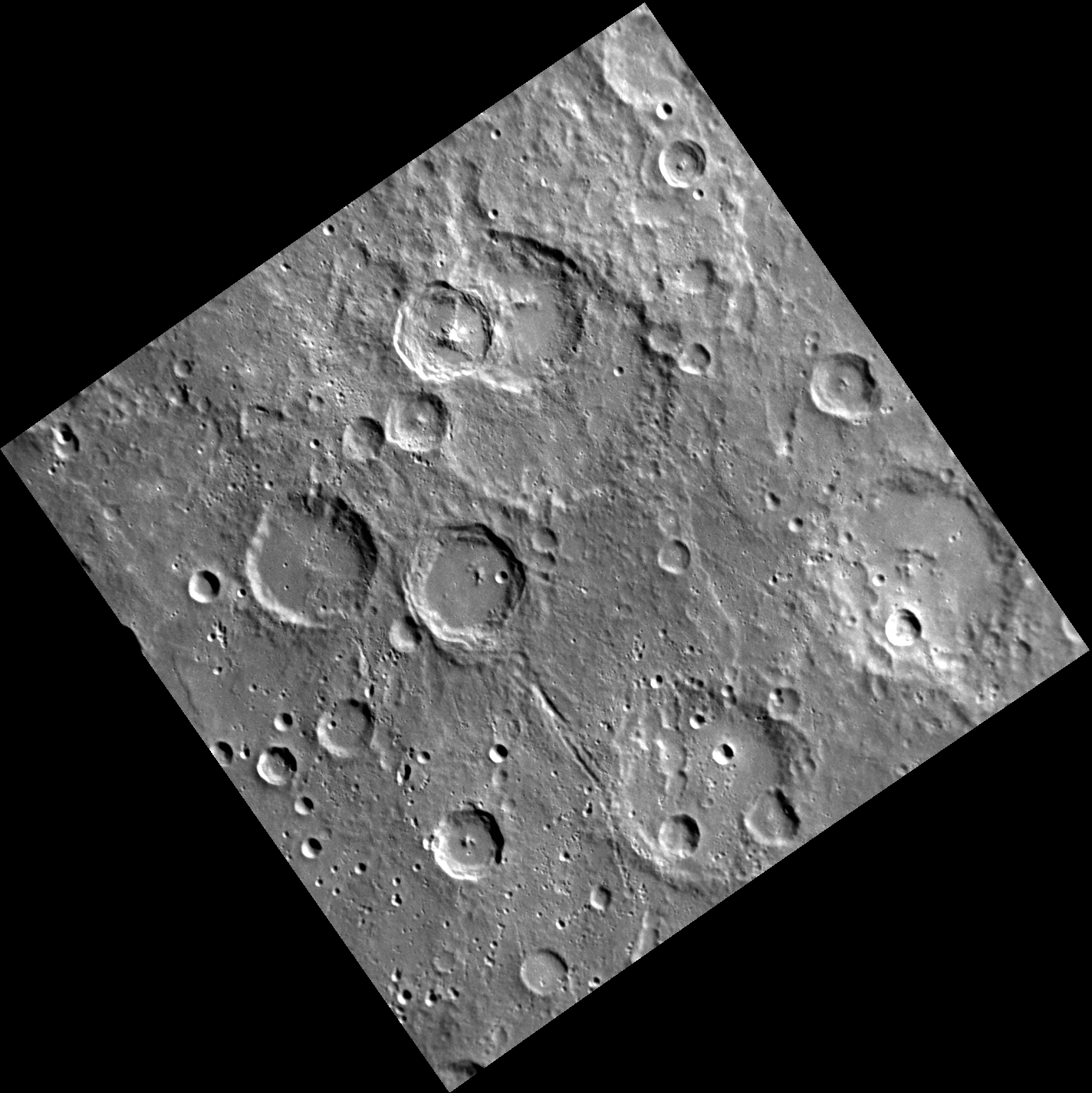
MESSENGER image of part of Utaridi Planitia, with many unnamed craters

Utaridi Planitia is a large plain in the southern hemisphere of Mercury. Most of it is in the Debussy quadrangle, but it extends to the east into Neruda quadrangle and to the south into Bach quadrangle. The plain was named by the IAU in 2017.

The large crater Alver lies in southern Utaridi Planitia. The Rembrandt basin lies to the north of it.
