= Liang Kʻai (crater) =

Crater on Mercury

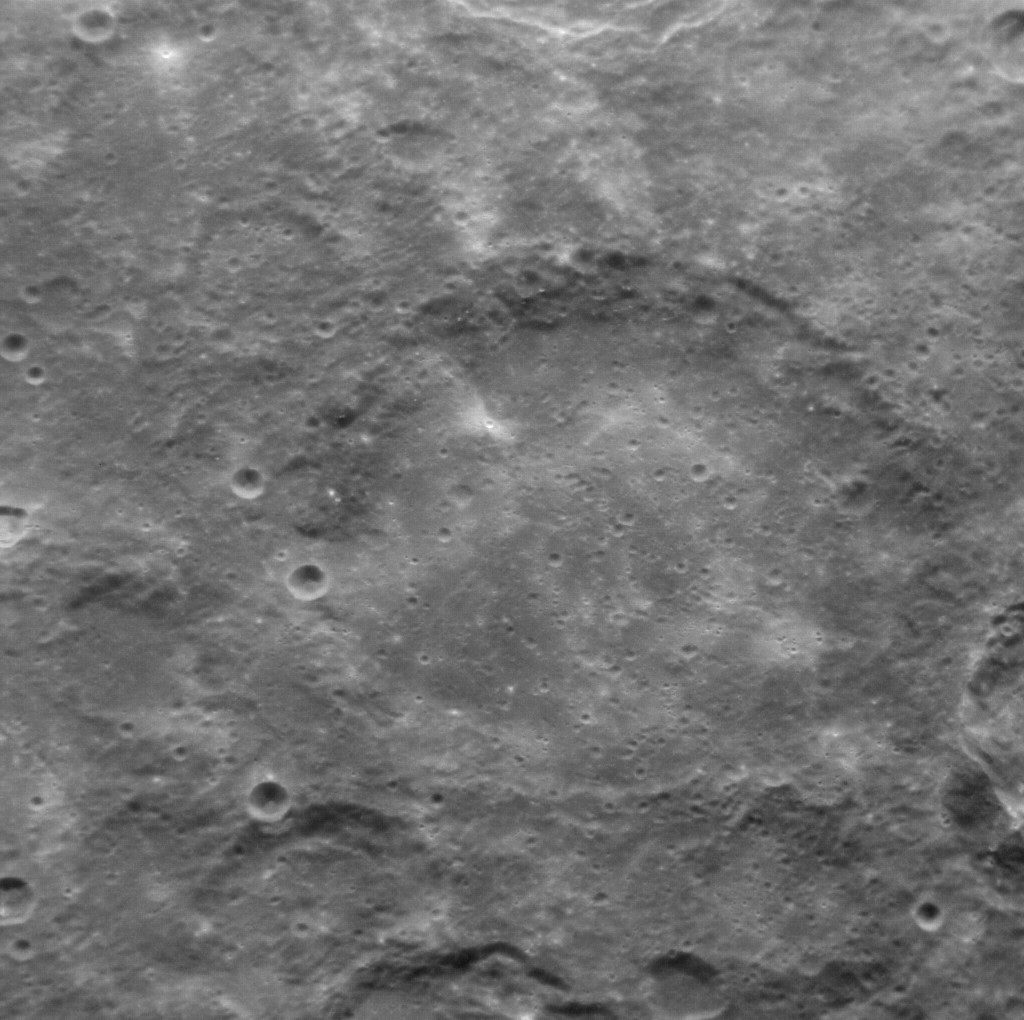
- MESSENGER NAC of Liang Kʻai
- Feature type: Impact crater
- Location: Neruda quadrangle, Mercury
- Coordinates: 40.3°S 182.8°W
- Diameter: 140 km (87 mi)
- Eponym: Liang Kai

Liang Kʻai is a crater on Mercury. It has a diameter of 140 kilometers. Its name was adopted by the International Astronomical Union in 1979. Liang Kʻai is named for the Chinese artist Liang Kai, who lived from 1140 to 1210.

There is evidence of explosive volcanism on the floor of the crater.

To the southwest of Liang Kʻai is Wen Tianxiang crater. To the south is Dostoevskij crater. To the north is Gainsborough crater.

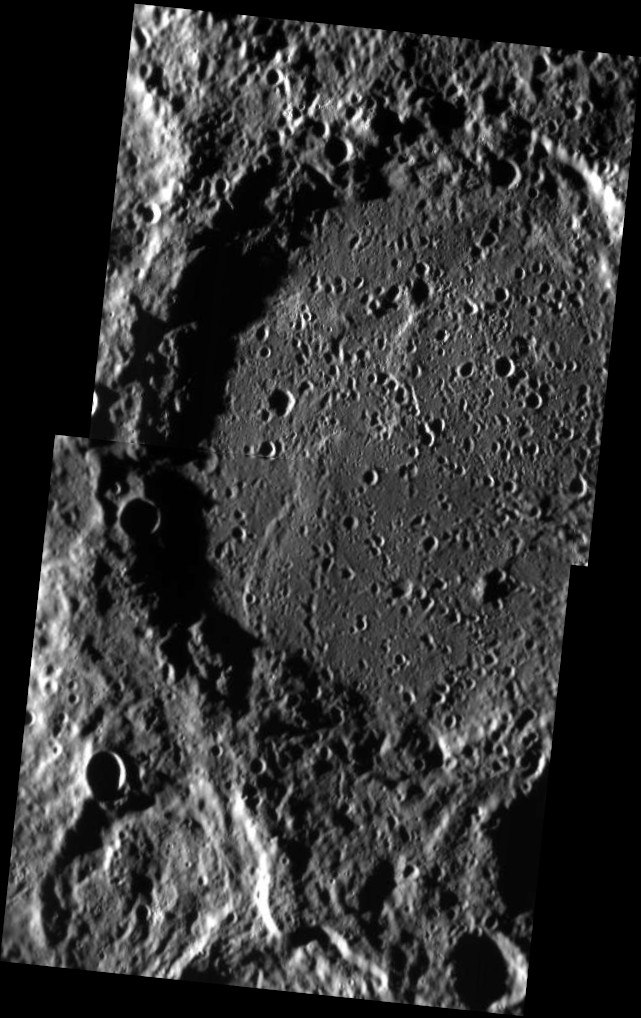
Liang Kʽai at low sun angle

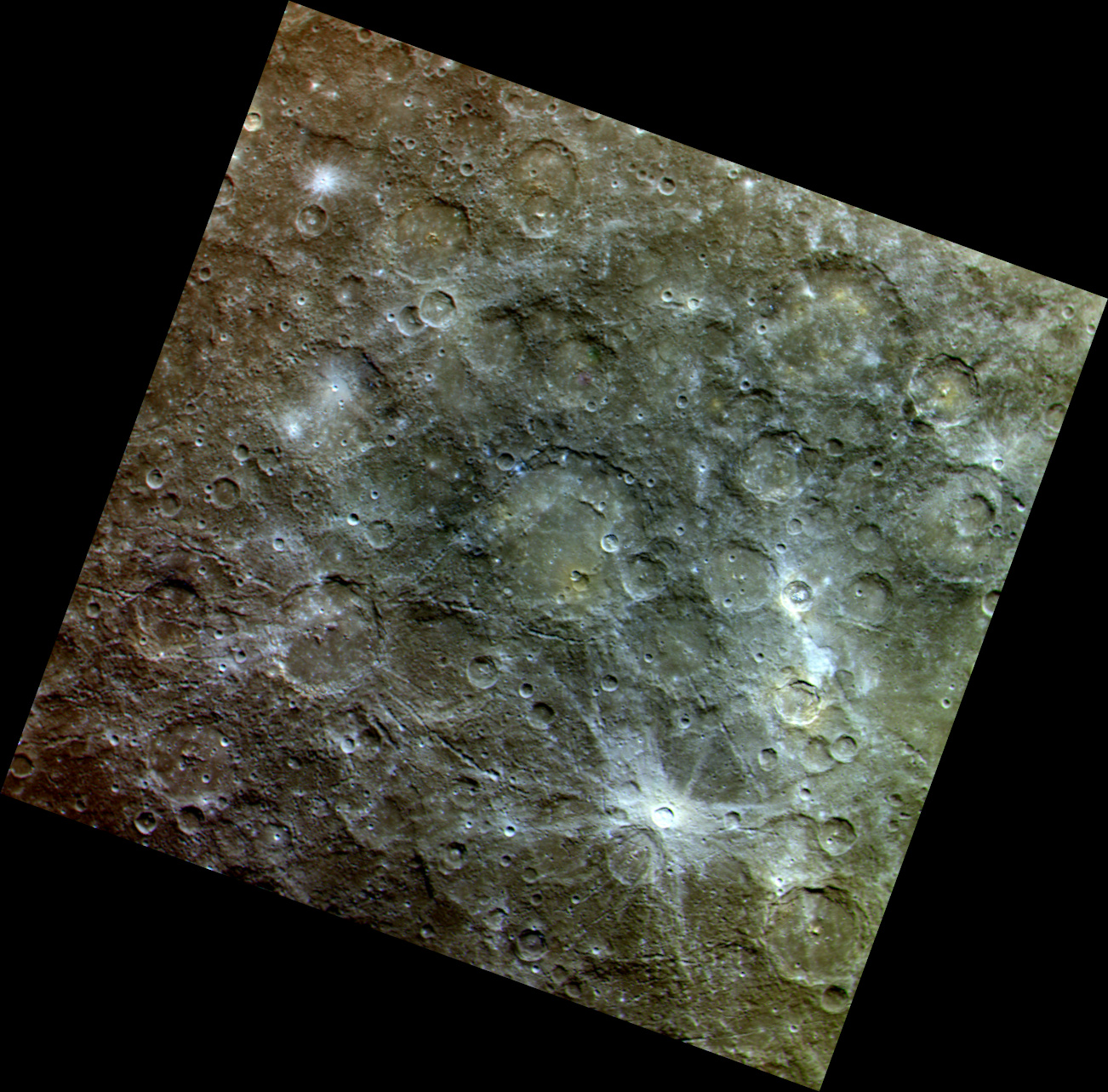
Exaggerated color MESSENGER image with Liang Kʽai in upper right
