= Alver =

Alver may refer to:

- Alver (surname)
- Alver Municipality, a municipality in Vestland county, Norway
- Alver, Norway, a village in Alver municipality in Vestland county, Norway
- Alver (crater), a crater on Mercury
