= Castiglione (crater) =

Crater on Mercury

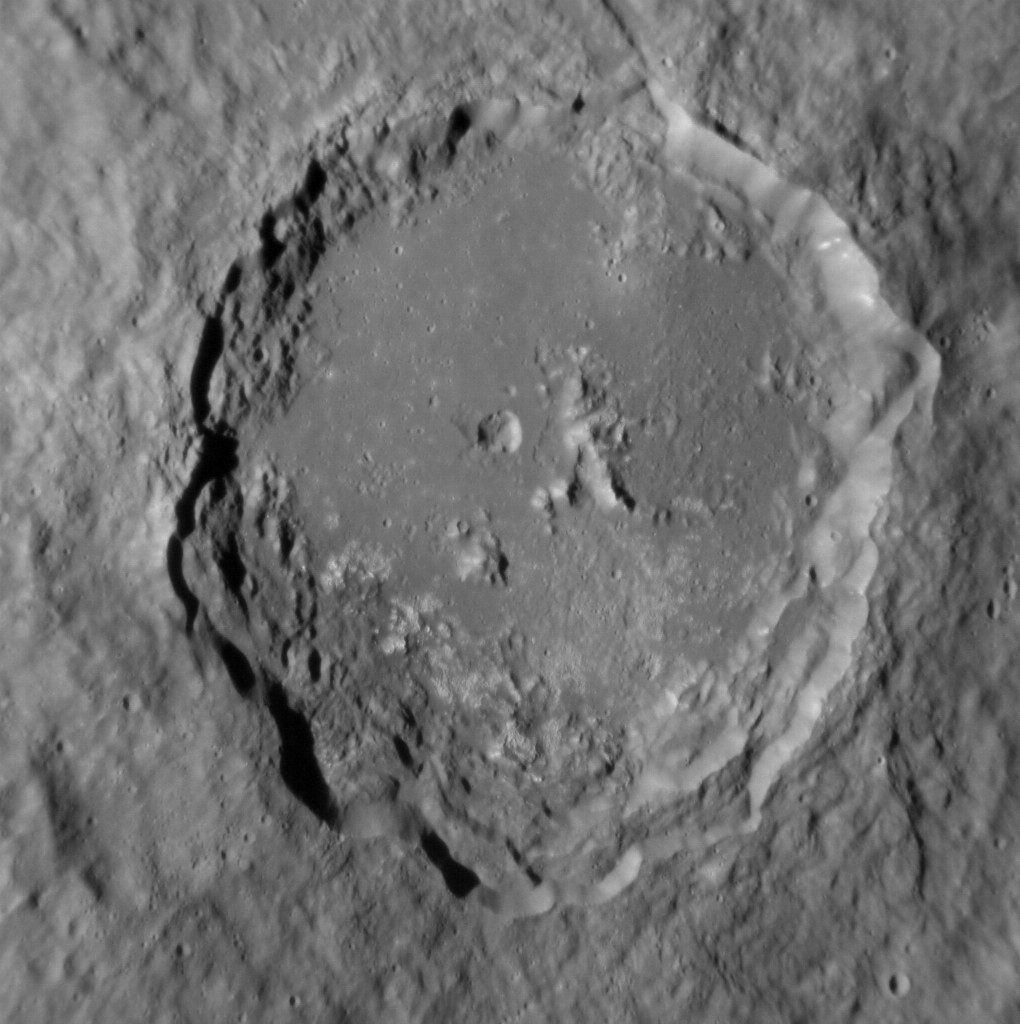
- MESSENGER NAC image of Castiglione
- Feature type: Central-peak impact crater
- Location: Debussy quadrangle, Mercury
- Coordinates: 40.87°S 87.96°E
- Diameter: 80 km (50 mi)
- Eponym: Giuseppe Castiglione

Castiglione is a crater on Mercury. Its name was adopted by the International Astronomical Union (IAU) on September 25, 2015. Castiglione is named for the Italian painter Giuseppe Castiglione.

In the southwest portion of Castiglione is a dark spot of low reflectance material (LRM), closely associated with hollows.

Castiglione lies on the south rim of the larger Rembrandt basin.
