= Enterprise Rupes =

Rupes on Mercury

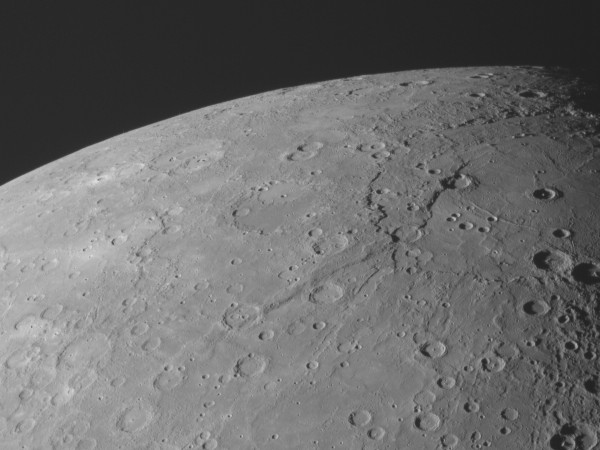
- Oblique MESSENGER WAC subframe
- Feature type: Rupes
- Coordinates: 36.54°S 283.46°W
- Eponym: USS Enterprise

Enterprise Rupes is an escarpment on Mercury, located at 36.54°S, 283.46°W. It is the longest rupes on Mercury, with a length of 820 kilometers (510 mi). The escarpment was named after USS Enterprise, a ship which conducted the first surveys of the Mississippi and Amazon rivers. The name was adopted by the International Astronomical Union on 3 June 2013.

Enterprise Rupes are within the Debussy quadrangle and they cut across Rembrandt crater. The scarp is the youngest tectonic feature observed in this region, because it cuts all other units including smooth plains.

== See also ==
- List of escarpments
