= Bellini (crater) =

Crater on Mercury

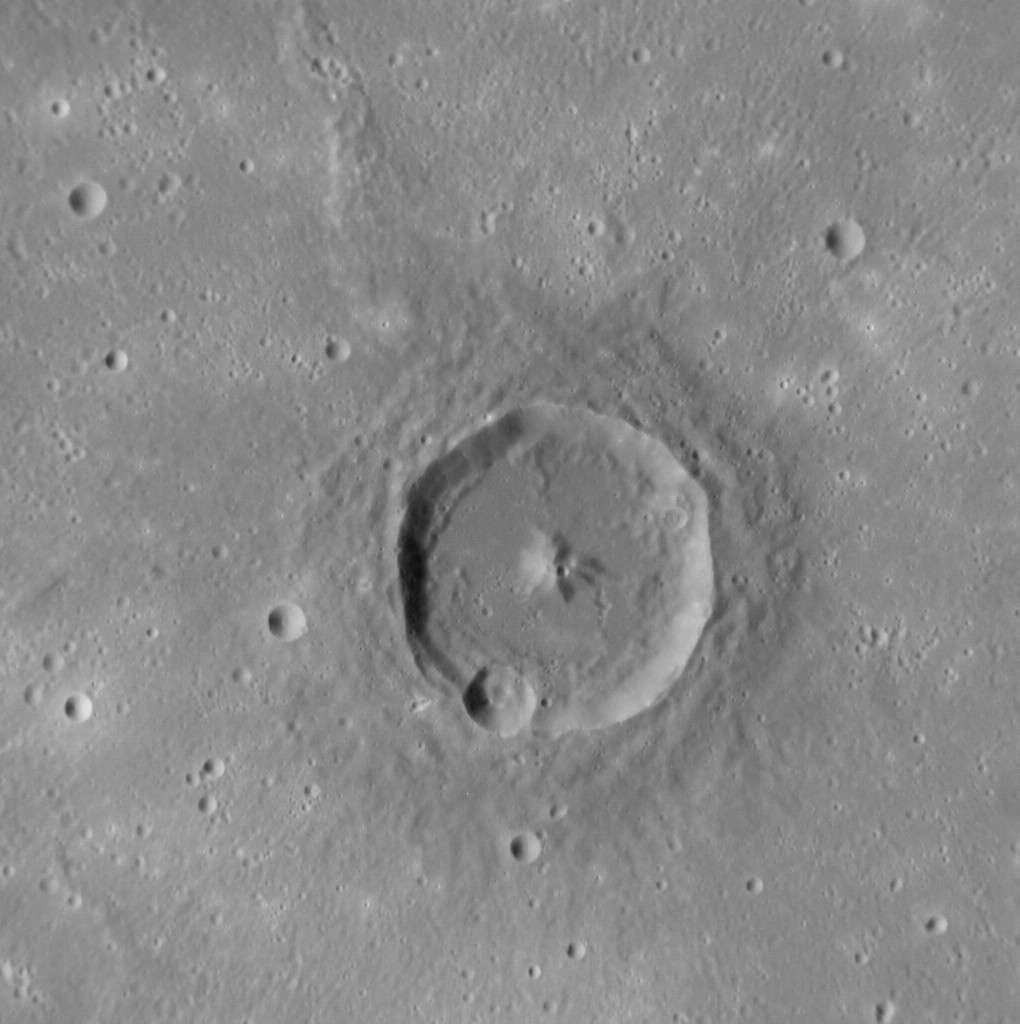
- MESSENGER NAC image of Bellini
- Feature type: Central-peak impact crater
- Location: Debussy quadrangle, Mercury
- Coordinates: 33.77°S 272.83°W
- Diameter: 45 km
- Eponym: Giovanni Bellini

Bellini is a crater on Mercury. Its name was adopted by the International Astronomical Union (IAU) in 2019, and is named for the Italian painter Giovanni Bellini.

Bellini lies near the center of the large Rembrandt basin.
