= Heaney (crater) =

Crater on Mercury

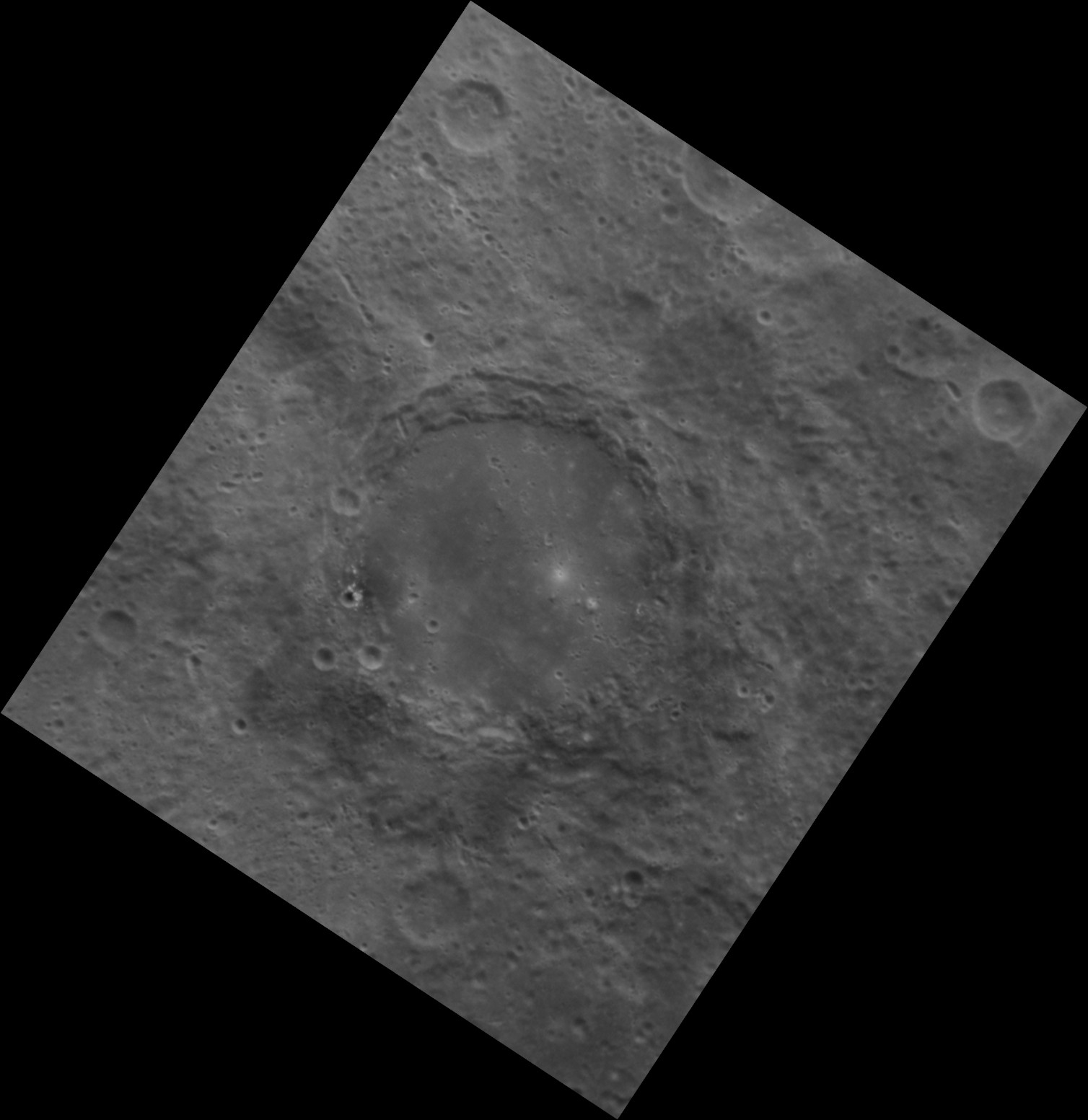
- MESSENGER NAC
- Planet: Mercury
- Coordinates: 33.77°S 237.71°W
- Quadrangle: Neruda
- Diameter: 125 km (78 mi)
- Eponym: Seamus Heaney

Heaney is a crater on Mercury. It has a diameter of 125 kilometres (78 miles). Its name was adopted by the International Astronomical Union (IAU) on March 20, 2017. Heaney is named for the Irish poet and playwright Seamus Heaney.

At the west rim of Heaney is a dark spot of low reflectance material (LRM), closely associated with hollows. The region along the south rim is also fairly dark.

To the northwest of Heaney is Amaral crater, and to the southwest is Beckett.

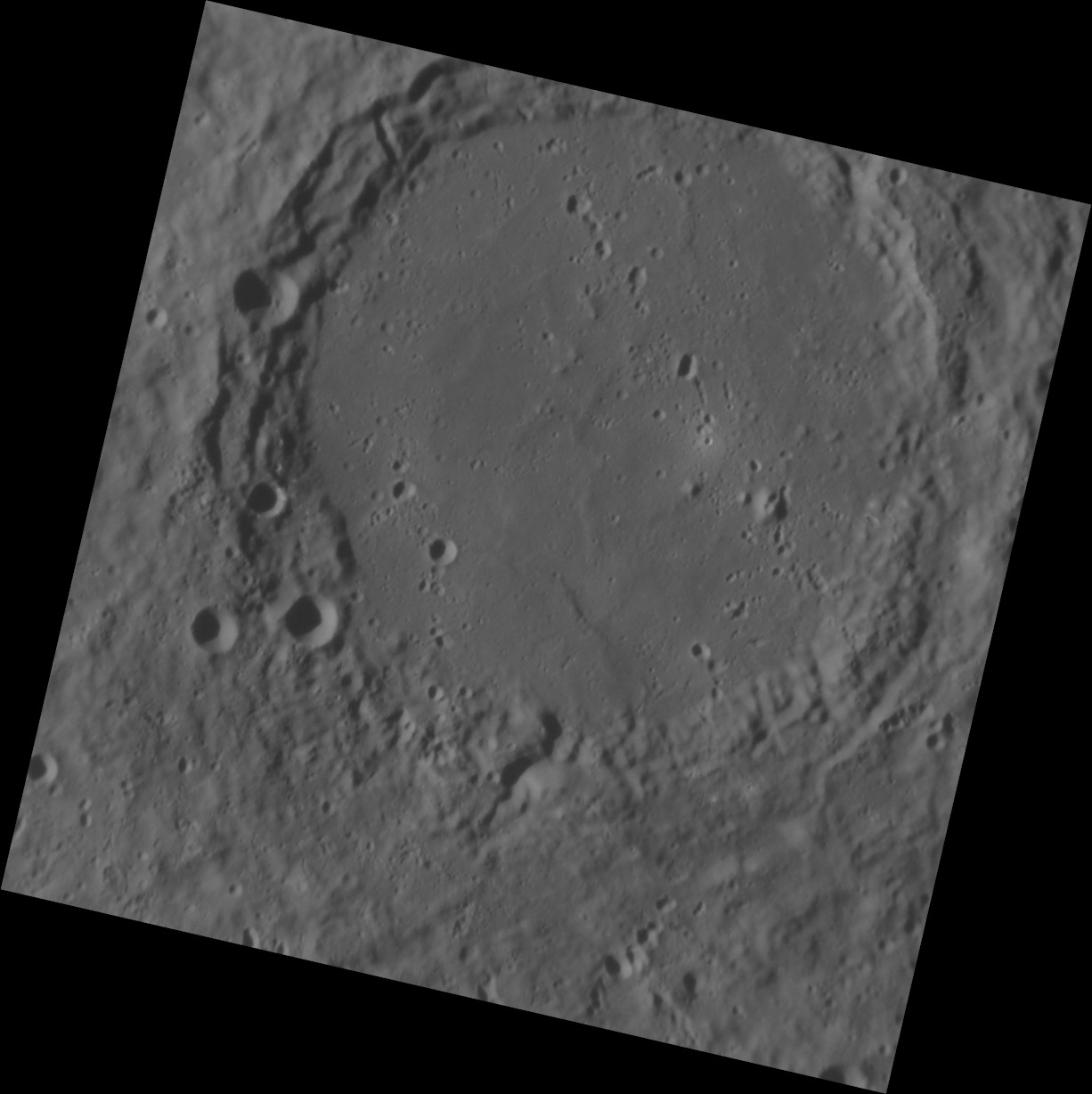
Another MESSENGER NAC image

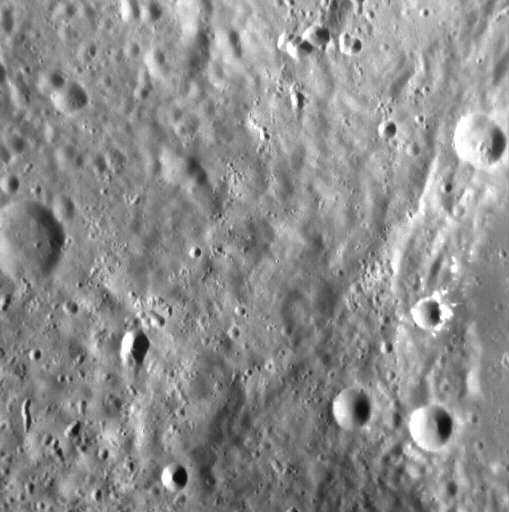
Small crater on rim of Heaney is the location of the dark spot

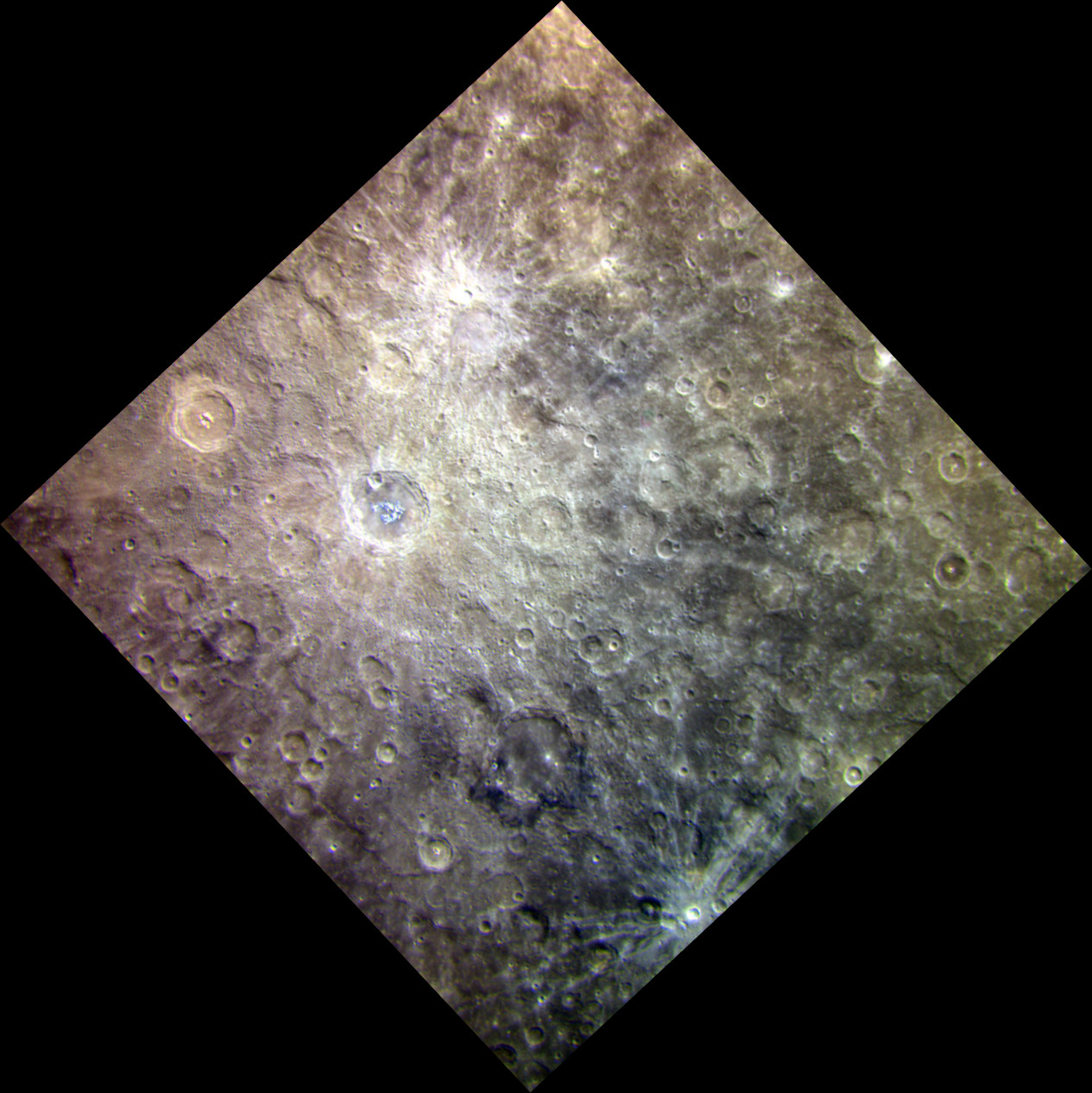
Regional approximate color view with Heaney below center and Amaral at left.
