= Gainsborough (crater) =

Crater on Mercury

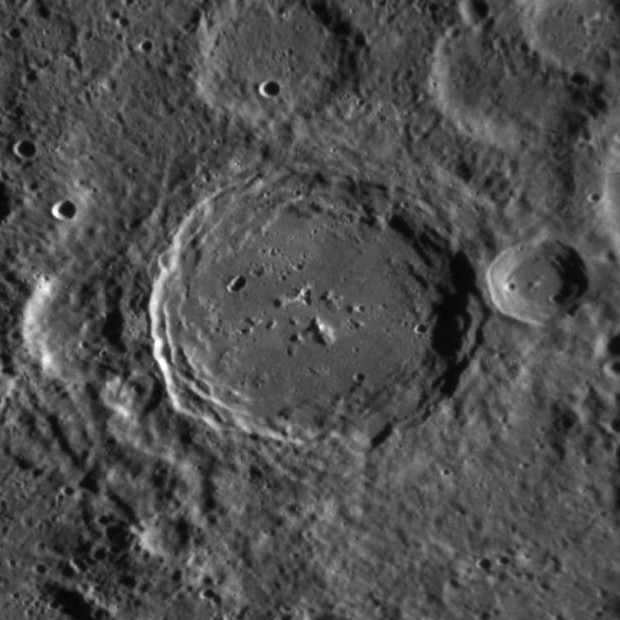
- MESSENGER WAC mosaic of Gainsborough
- Feature type: Central-peak impact crater
- Location: Neruda quadrangle, Mercury
- Coordinates: 35.73°S 184.52°W
- Diameter: 95 km (59 mi)
- Eponym: Thomas Gainsborough

Gainsborough is a crater on Mercury. It has a diameter of 95 kilometers. Its name was adopted by the International Astronomical Union (IAU) in 1985. Gainsborough is named for the English painter Thomas Gainsborough, who lived from 1727 to 1788.

To the south of Gainsborough is Liang Kʽai crater.

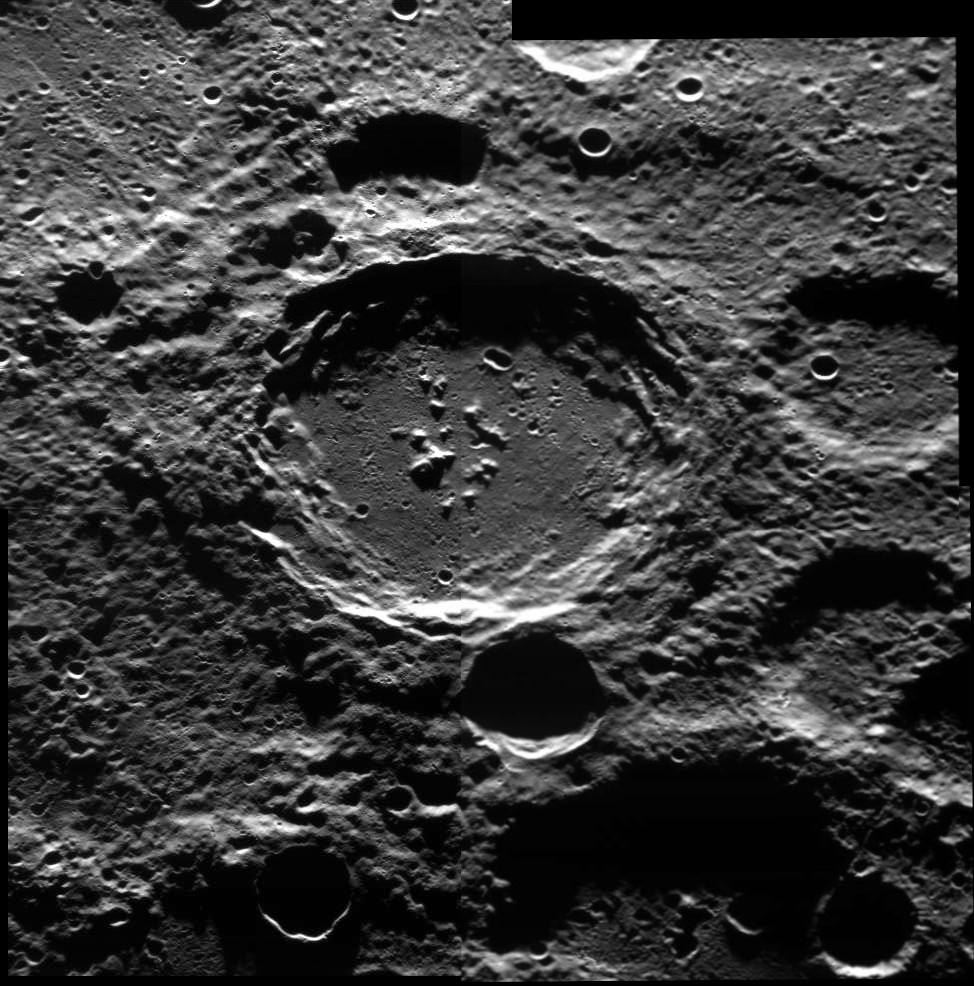
Oblique view of Gainsborough near the terminator
