= Amaral (crater) =

Crater on Mercury

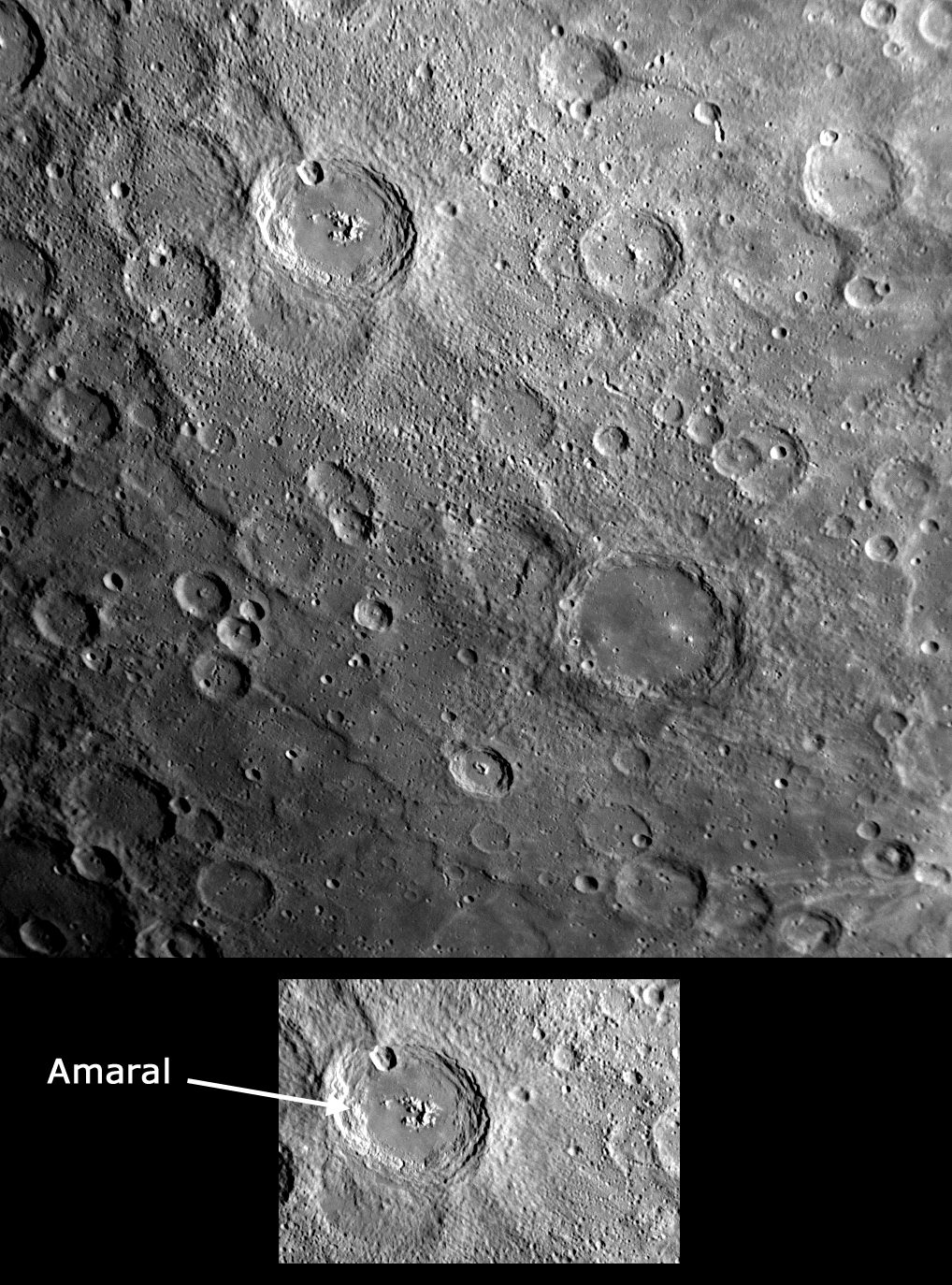
- An image of Amaral and surrounding regions; Amaral is labelled in the bottom inset
- Feature type: Central-peak impact crater
- Location: Neruda quadrangle, Mercury
- Coordinates: 26.4°S 242.3°W
- Diameter: 105 km (65 mi)
- Eponym: Tarsila do Amaral

Amaral is a crater on the planet Mercury. With its smooth floor, surrounding ejecta, and small secondary craters, it appears noticeably younger than the heavily cratered surface around it. Along with a smooth crater floor, Amaral also has a central peak. Bright material on this peak is of particular interest as it appears to have an unusual color. In color-enhanced images, the central peak of Amaral appears as a bright blue color in striking contrast to the otherwise orange tones of surface material nearby. The different color of the central peak likely indicates rocks with different chemical composition from those on the neighboring surface.

Amaral is the second-largest crater of the Kuiperian system on Mercury, at 105 km (65 mi) diameter, after Bartók at 118 km (73 mi). It is followed by Tyagaraja crater.

A confirmed dark spot is present in southeastern Amaral.

The crater Heaney is to the southeast of Amaral.

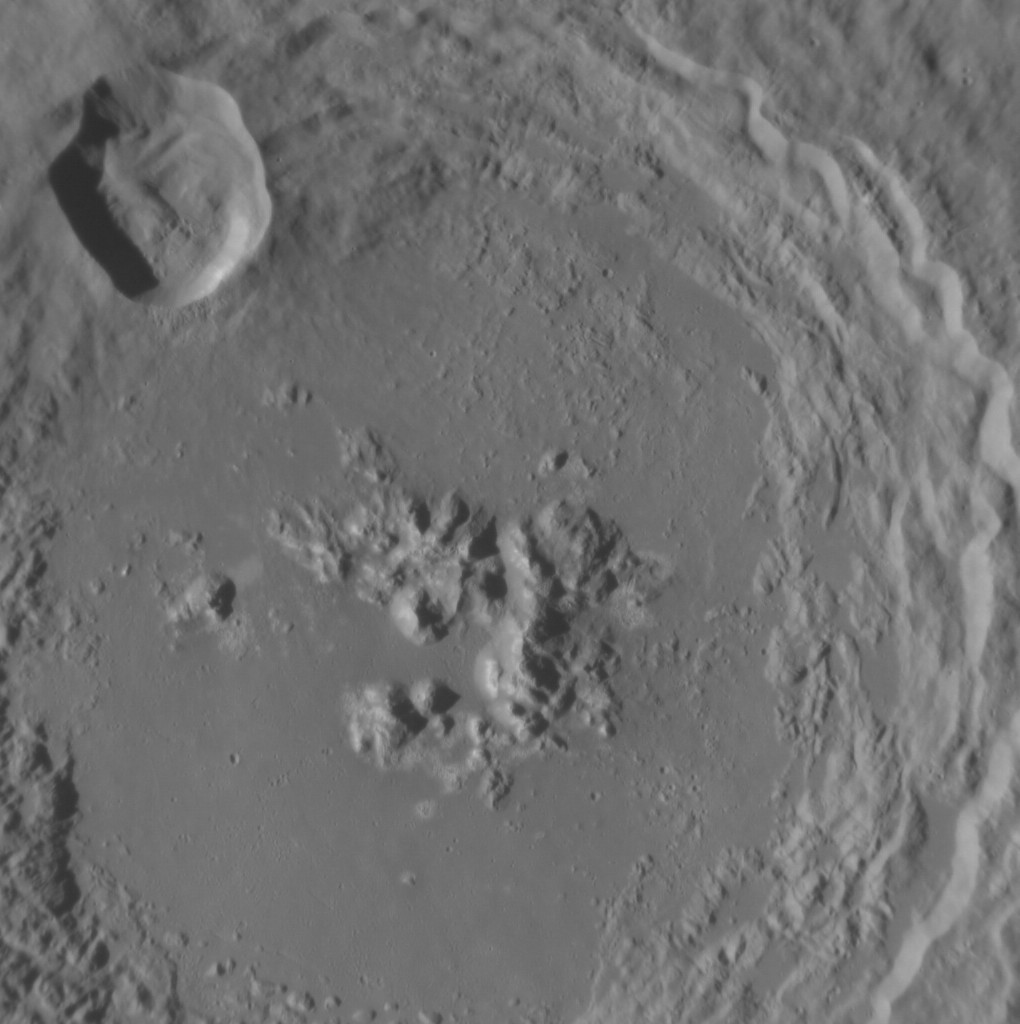
High resolution view of the interior, from MESSENGER

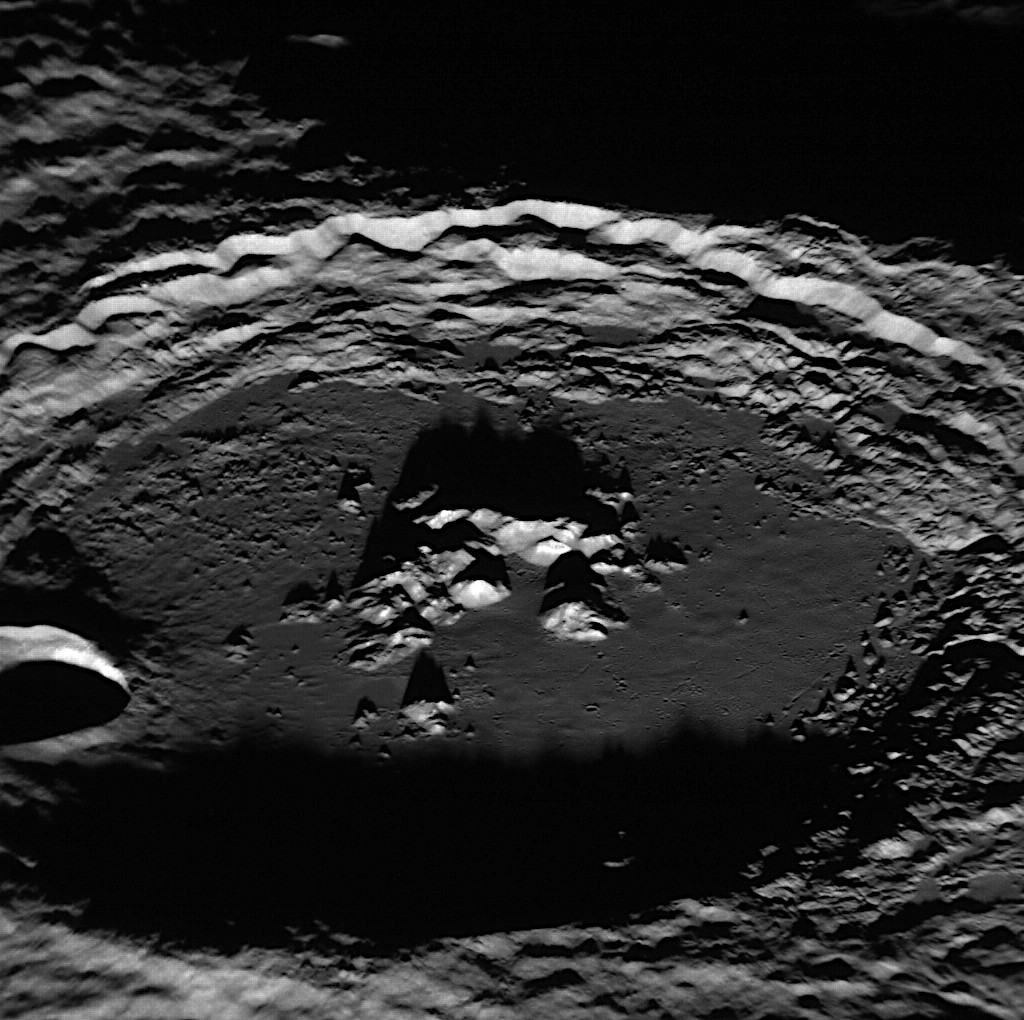
Oblique view at a low sun angle

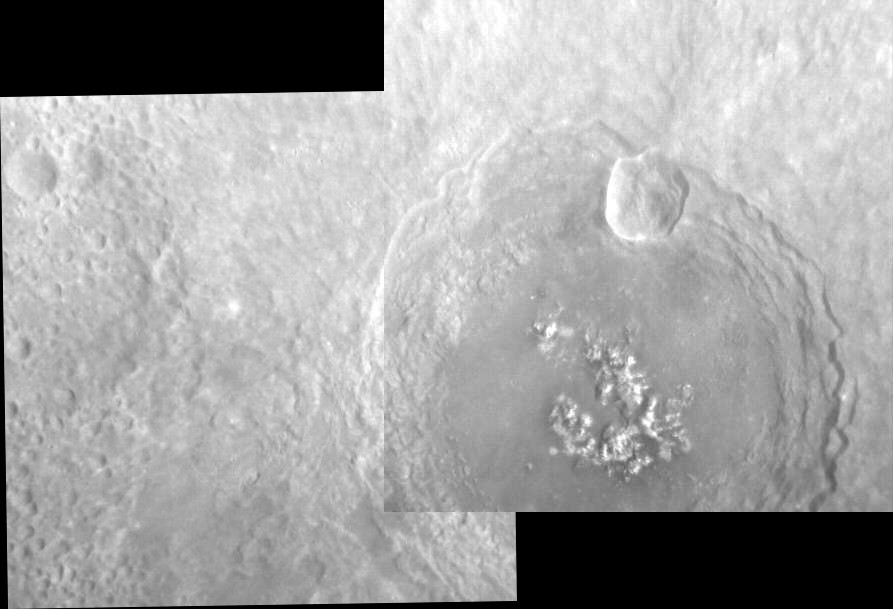
Mosaic showing most of the crater at a high sun angle. Note the bright central peak complex.

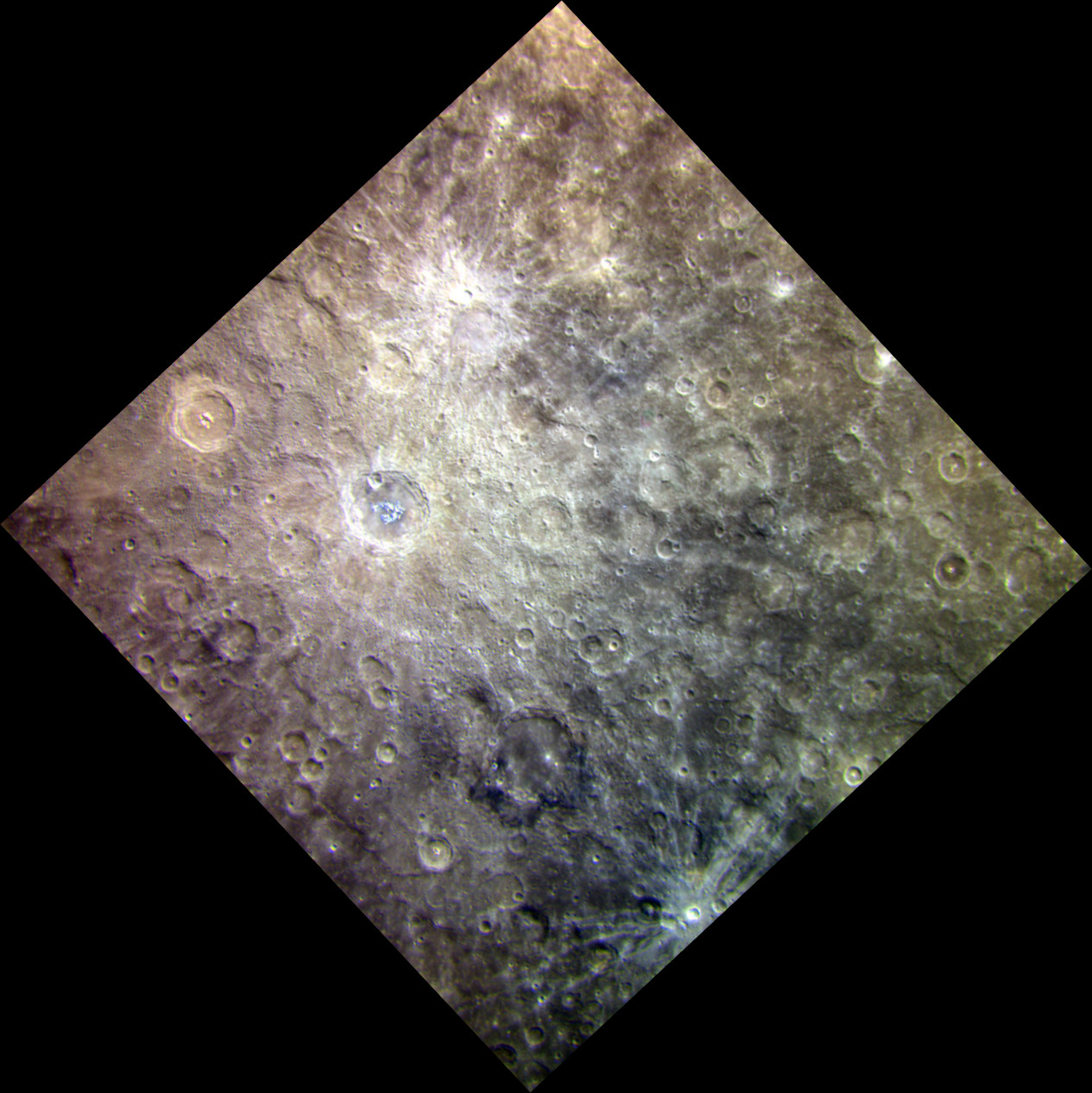
Regional approximate color view with Amaral at left, showing its bright, extensive ray system.
