= Alver (surname) =

Alver is a surname. Notable people with the surname include:

- Andres Alver (born 1953), Estonian architect
- Berthe Amalie Alver (1846–1905), Norwegian author
- Betti Alver (1906–1989), Estonian poet
- Eduard Alver (1886–1939), Estonian lawyer, policeman, politician, and Commander of the Estonian Defence League
- Inger Alver (1892–1982), Norwegian writer
- Jonas Alver (born 1973), Norwegian bass player
- Köksal Alver (born 1970), Turkish sociologist
- Tähti Alver (born 1994), Estonian triple jumper and long jumper

== Fictional characters ==
- Luisa Alver, a character on the television show, Jane the Virgin
