= Zmija Facula =

Facula on Mercury

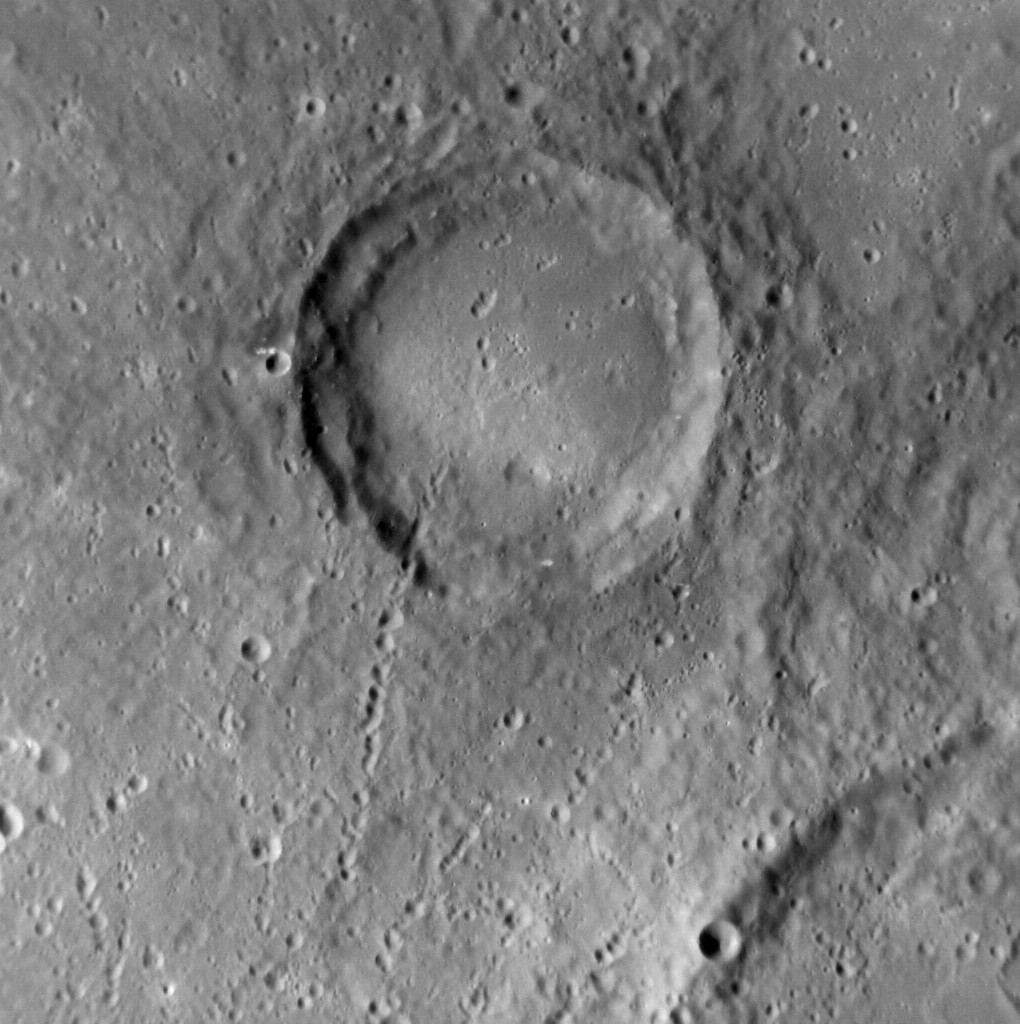
MESSENGER NAC image, showing Zmija Facula within the crater near center

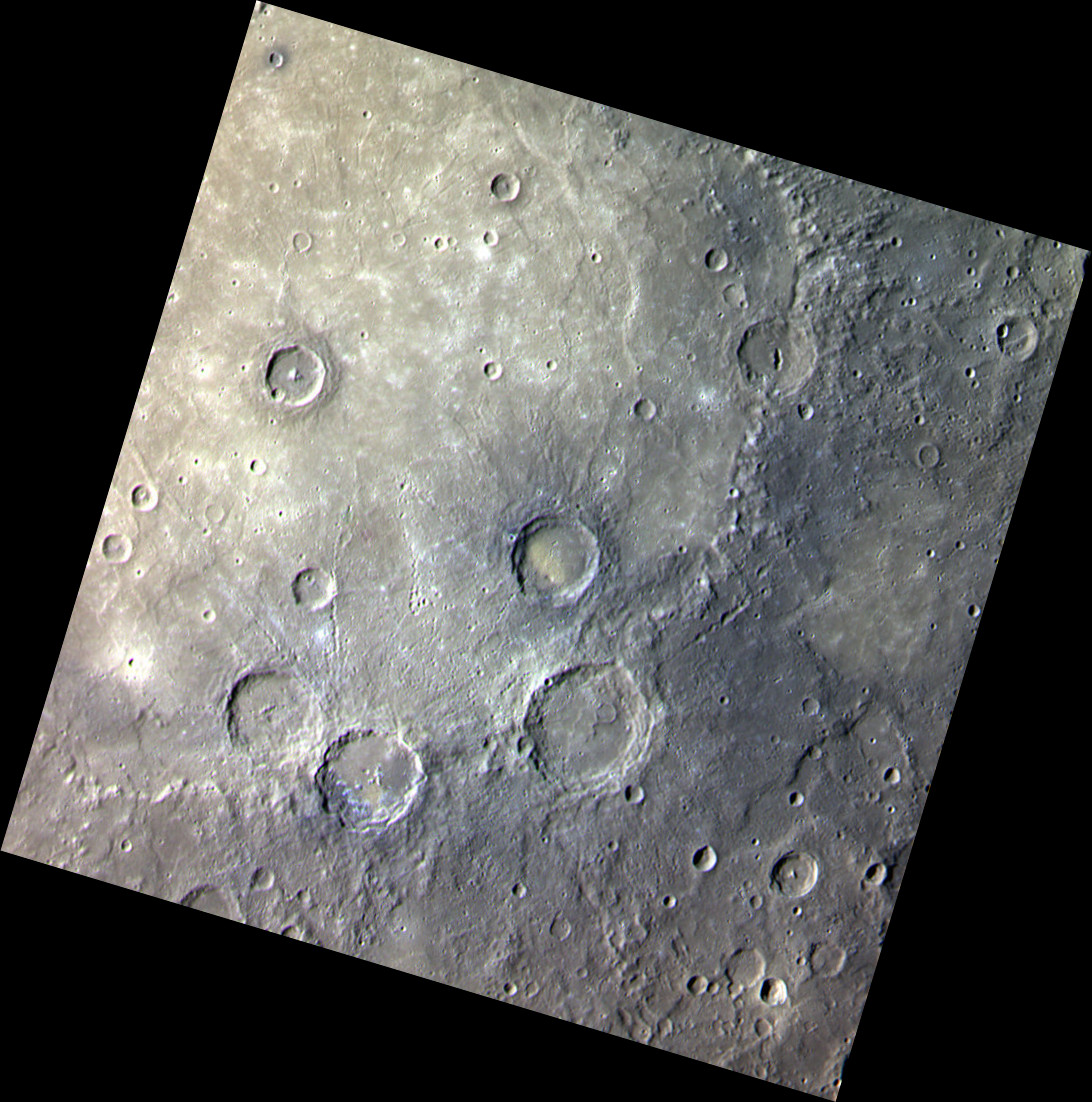
Approximate color image centered on Zmija Facula within Rembrandt

Zmija Facula is a bright region on the surface of Mercury, located within an unnamed crater that is itself within the larger Rembrandt basin. It was named by the IAU in June 2020. Zmija is the Serbian word for snake.

To the northwest of the facula, along the northwest rim of the unnamed crater, is a dark spot of low reflectance material (LRM), closely associated with hollows.
