= Wen Tianxiang (crater) =

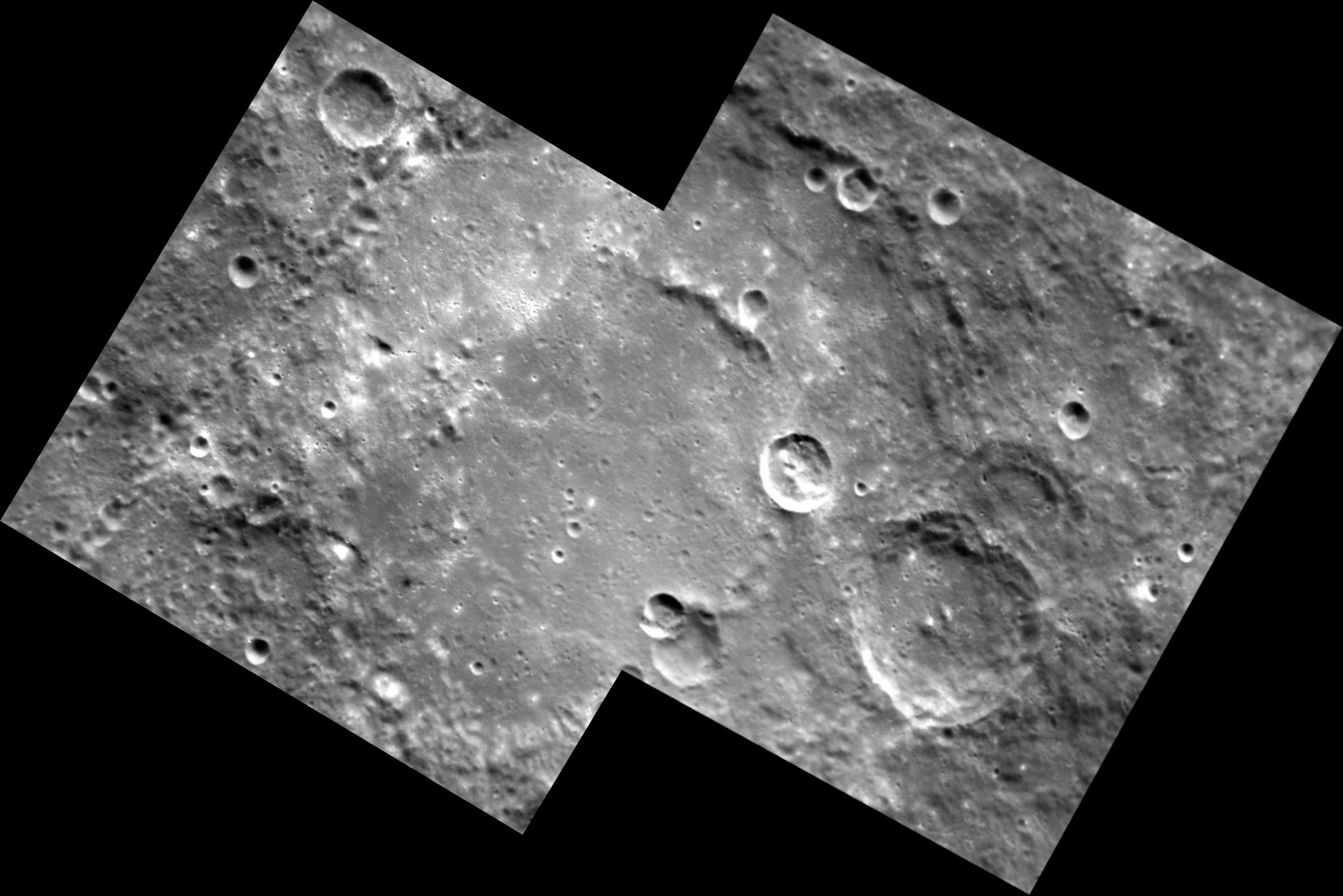
- MESSENGER NAC mosaic
- Planet: Mercury
- Coordinates: 45.34°S 191.6°W
- Quadrangle: Neruda
- Diameter: 166.42 km (103.41 mi)
- Eponym: Wen Tianxiang

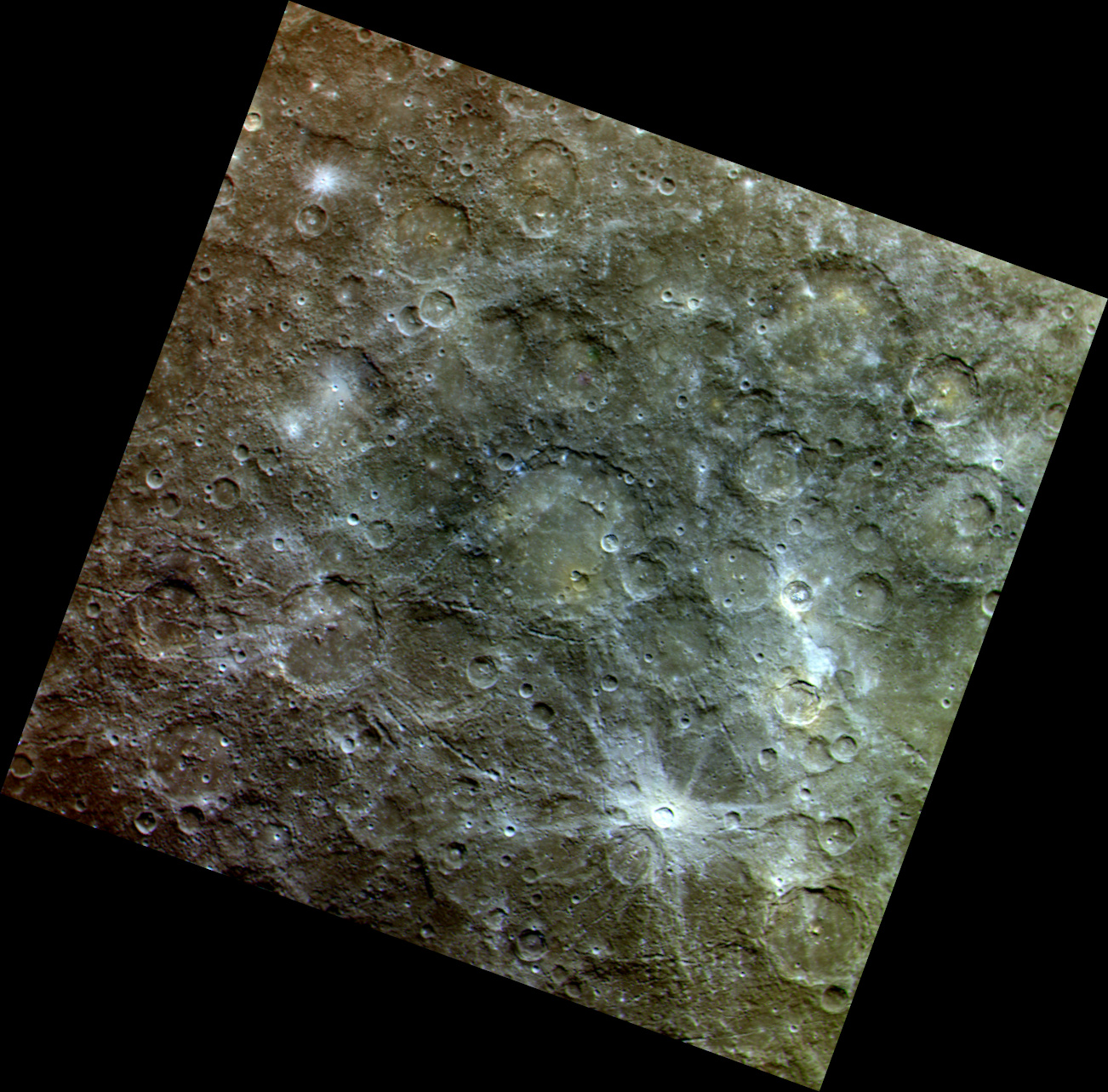
Exaggerated color MESSENGER image centered on Wen Tianxiang

Wen Tianxiang is a crater on Mercury. Its name was adopted by the International Astronomical Union (IAU) in June 2020, and it is named for Chinese writer and poet Wen Tianxiang.

Wen Tianxiang is one of 110 peak ring basins on Mercury.

Within southern Wen Tianxiang crater is Yinshe Facula, a bright area associated with a small crater. Yinshe is the Chinese word for silver snake.
