= Rembrandt (crater) =

Crater on Mercury

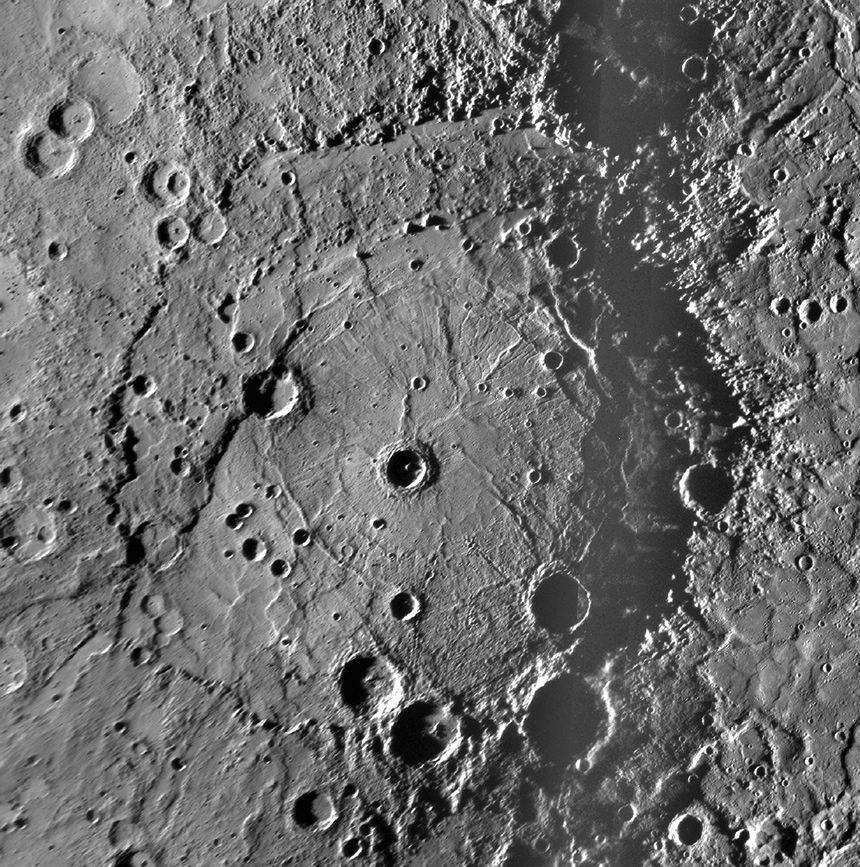
- Rembrandt crater by MESSENGER in October 2008. Image width ca. 1,000 km (620 mi).
- Feature type: Multi-ring impact basin
- Location: Debussy quadrangle, Mercury
- Coordinates: 32.89°S 272.13°W
- Diameter: 716 km (445 mi)
- Discoverer: MESSENGER
- Eponym: Rembrandt Harmenszoon van Rijn

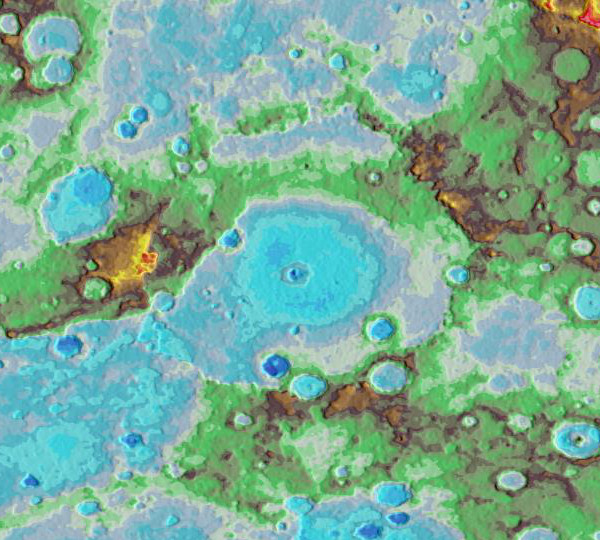
Topographic map of Rembrandt

Rembrandt is a large impact crater on Mercury. With a diameter of 716 km it is the second-largest impact basin on the planet, after Caloris, and is one of the larger craters in the Solar System. It was discovered by MESSENGER during its second flyby of Mercury on October 6, 2008. The crater is 3.9 billion years old, and was created during the period of Late Heavy Bombardment. The density and size distribution of impact craters along Rembrandt's rim indicate that it is one of the youngest impact basins on Mercury.

The crater is named after Dutch painter Rembrandt Harmenszoon van Rijn.

== Background ==
Rembrandt was discovered in the images taken by the MESSENGER spacecraft during its second flyby of Mercury on October 6, 2008. The crater is situated in the southern hemisphere of the planet at the latitude of about −33°. It is named after famous Dutch painter Rembrandt Harmenszoon van Rijn (1606–1669). The name Rembrandt was approved by the International Astronomical Union on February 27, 2009.

== Geology ==
Rembrandt is the second largest impact basin (crater) on Mercury after Caloris. Its outer boundary, which is called crater rim, is defined by a ring of inward facing scarps and massifs. The diameter of this ring is 715 km (444 mi)— half the diameter of Caloris. The basin is surrounded by blocky impact deposits made from material excavated at depth. The ejecta are mainly observed to the north and northeast from the basin. The interior of Rembrandt includes two terrain types: hummocky terrain and smooth plains. The former occupies a part of the basin's floor near its northern margin forming an incomplete ring about 130 km (81 mi) wide. The latter fill much of the interior of Rembrandt. These two plain types are separated from each other by a ring of massifs, which is about 450 km in diameter. This boundary may correspond to the outer edge of the transient cavity created by the impact, which later collapsed.

The smooth plains filling the inner part of Rembrandt are interpreted to be of the volcanic origin. They are probably similar to the lunar maria, although they are lighter than the surrounding plains, which is the opposite of what is observed on the Moon. The smooth plains are intersected by a system of wrinkle-ridges and troughs, named Borobudur Fossae, both having radial or concentric shapes. The concentric ridges form a nearly complete ring with a diameter of about 375 km. The radial wrinkle ridges and troughs occur mainly inside this ring. Both radial and concentric ridges have widths between 1 and 10 km (0.62 and 6.21 mi) and can be as long as 180 km (110 mi). The troughs are generally younger than the ridges, because they cut the latter. The width of the troughs varies from 1 to 3 km (0.62 to 1.86 mi). Some radial troughs closely follow wrinkle ridges forming a unique wheel spoke pattern. Troughs are interpreted to be extensional features—grabens, while wrinkle ridges are contractional.

Rembrandt basin is cross-cut by a large lobate scarp running from the southwest to the north, named Enterprise Rupes. It is about 600 km (370 mi) long and belongs to the global system of scarps, which covers the entire surface of Mercury. These features are thought to have resulted from the global contraction of the planet as its interior cooled. The scarp is the youngest tectonic feature observed in this region, because it cuts all other units including smooth plains.

Both the rim and interior of Rembrandt are covered by numerous impact craters, including Bellini, a 45 km (28 mi)-wide crater near Rembrandt's centre. Karsh and Castiglione craters lie on the rim. A bright area called Zmija Facula lies within an unnamed crater in southeastern Rembrandt. The central smooth plains embay and partially flood many of these craters suggesting that the plains resulted from the prolonged effusive volcanic activity. Those impact craters, which formed after the end of volcanism, indicate that in the center of Rembrandt lava, layers can be as thick as 2 km (1.2 mi).

== Age and formation ==
The data available on the crater indicate that Rembrandt is one of the youngest giant impact features on Mercury. Its age is roughly the same as that of Caloris. The basin probably formed near the end of the Late Heavy Bombardment of the inner Solar System about 3.9 billion years ago. The impact had excavated material from the lower part of the crust leading to the formation of the dark and relatively blue impact ejecta, which surrounds Rembrandt. The thinning of the crust, which resulted from the impact, stimulated effusive volcanic activity. Light-colored lavas filled the inner part of Rembrandt causing it to subside, which led to the contraction of the basin's floor and formation of wrinkle ridges. The later floor uplift, the cause of which is not known, led to the extension and formation of troughs.

The latest episode of tectonic activity led to the formation of the lobate scarp, which actually runs tangentially to the ring of wrinkle ridges. This indicates that the ring, which may correspond to a buried interior basin ring, influenced the scarp formation. After that, the internal activity probably ended, and the surface was shaped only by relatively infrequent impacts.

== Views ==
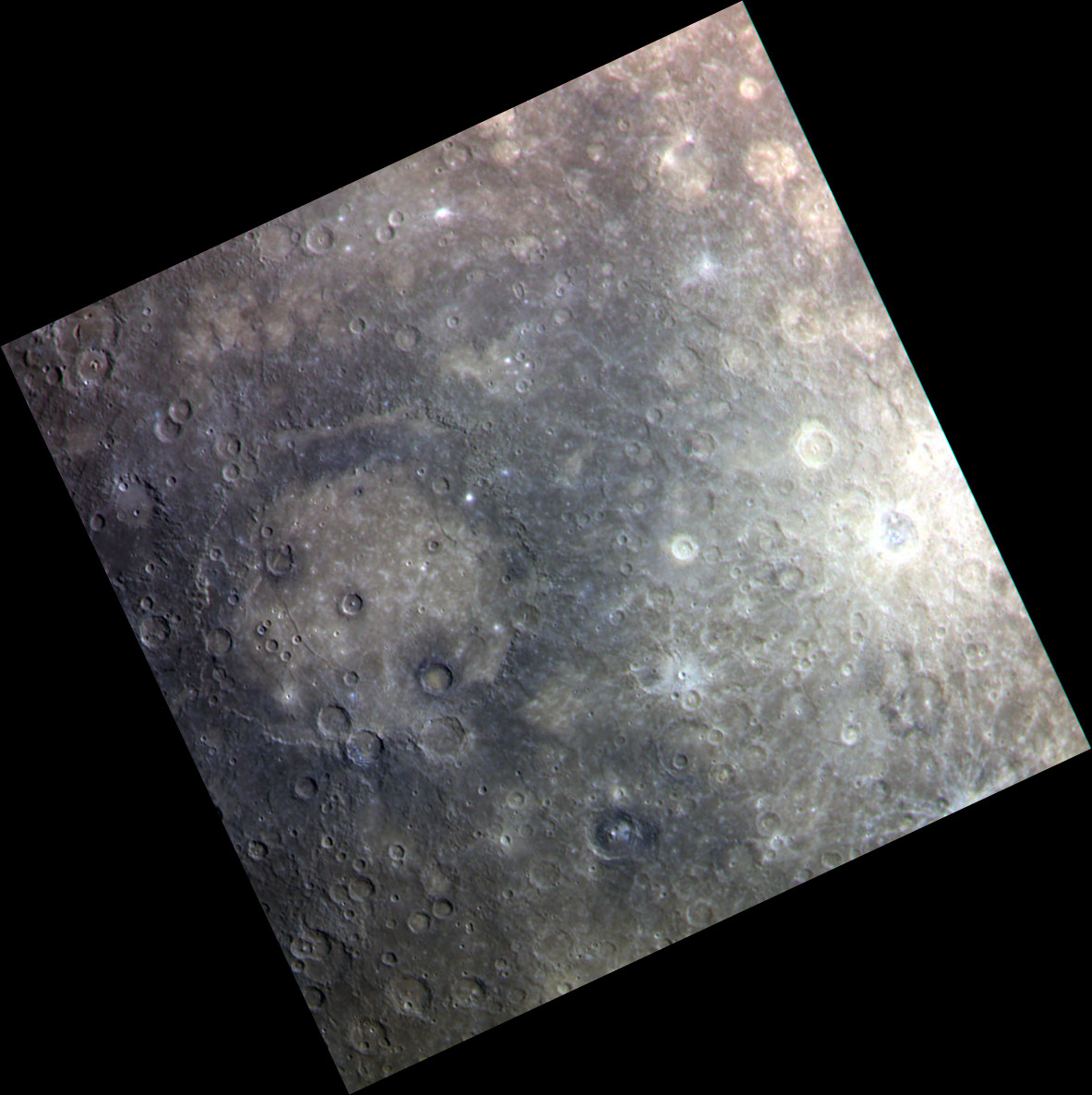
Regional color view with Rembrandt at left and Amaral at right, with bright rays

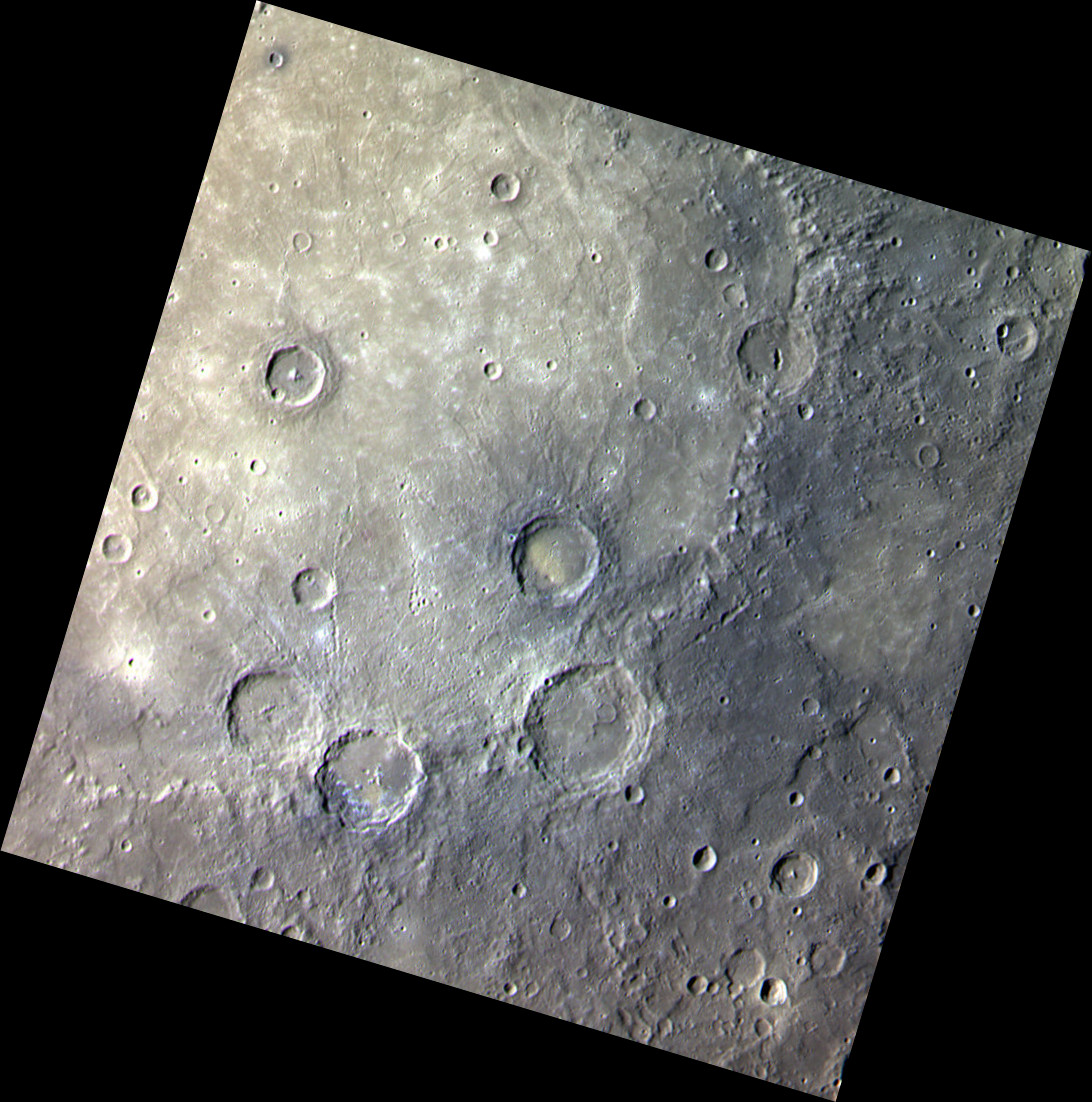
Another color view with Zmija Facula at center, Bellini at left, and Castiglione at lower left

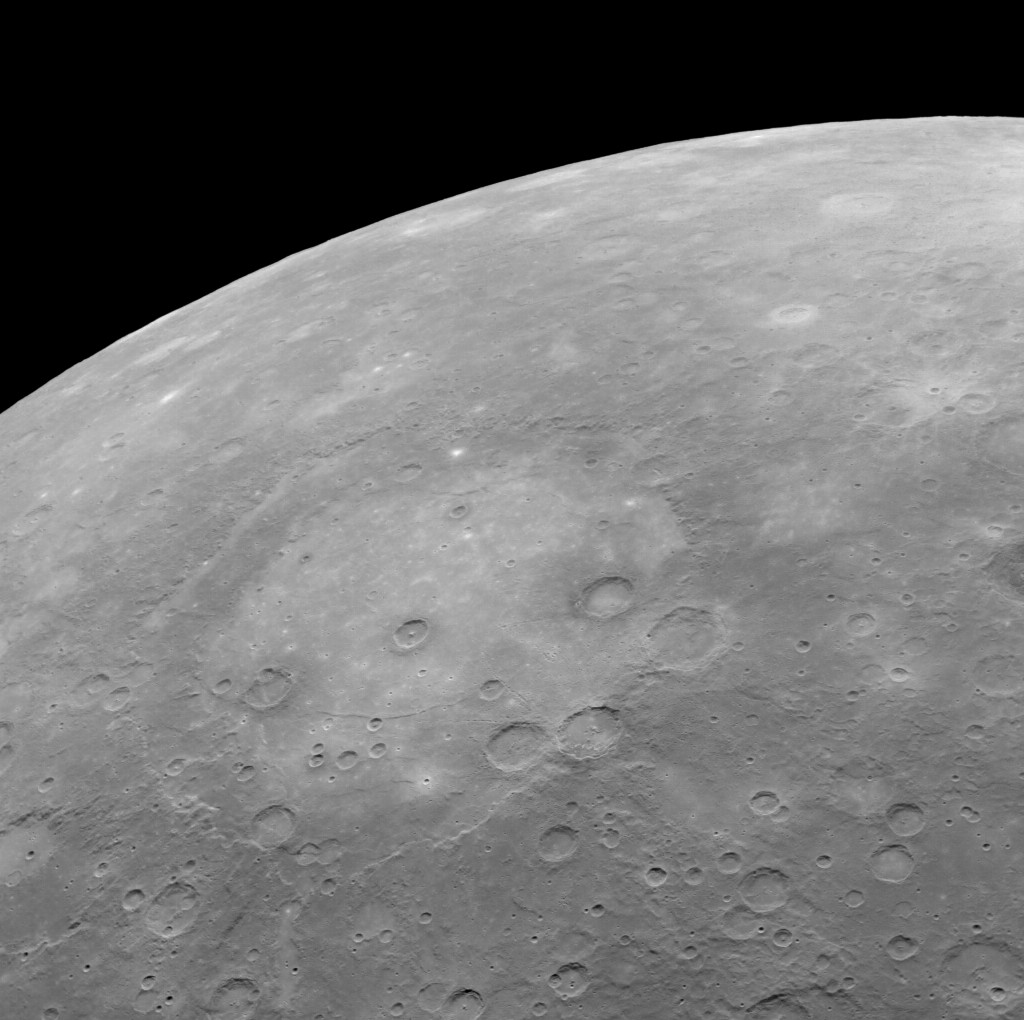
Rembrandt crater as seen from MESSENGER

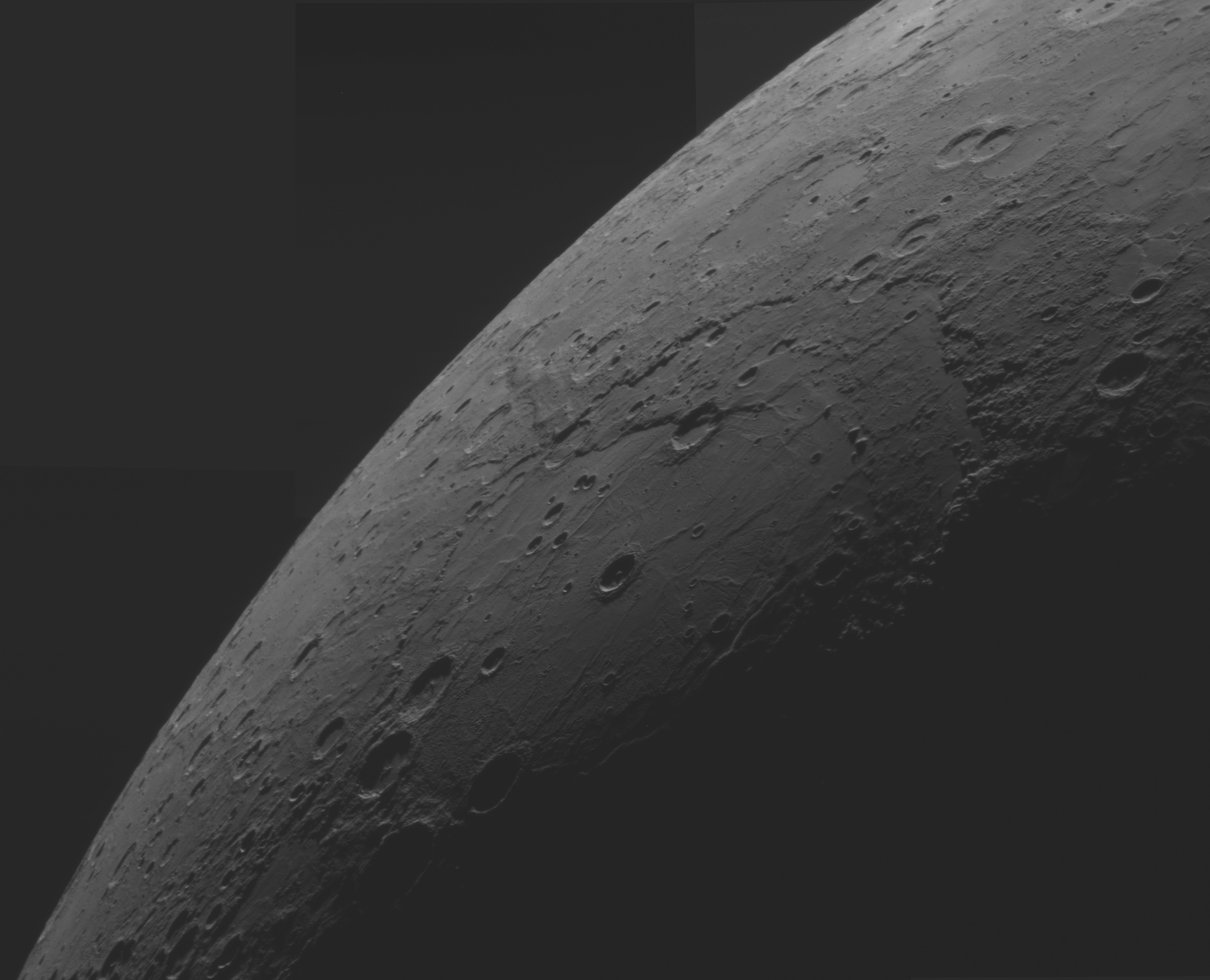
Oblique view from second flyby in October 2008
