= Alver (crater) =

Crater on Mercury

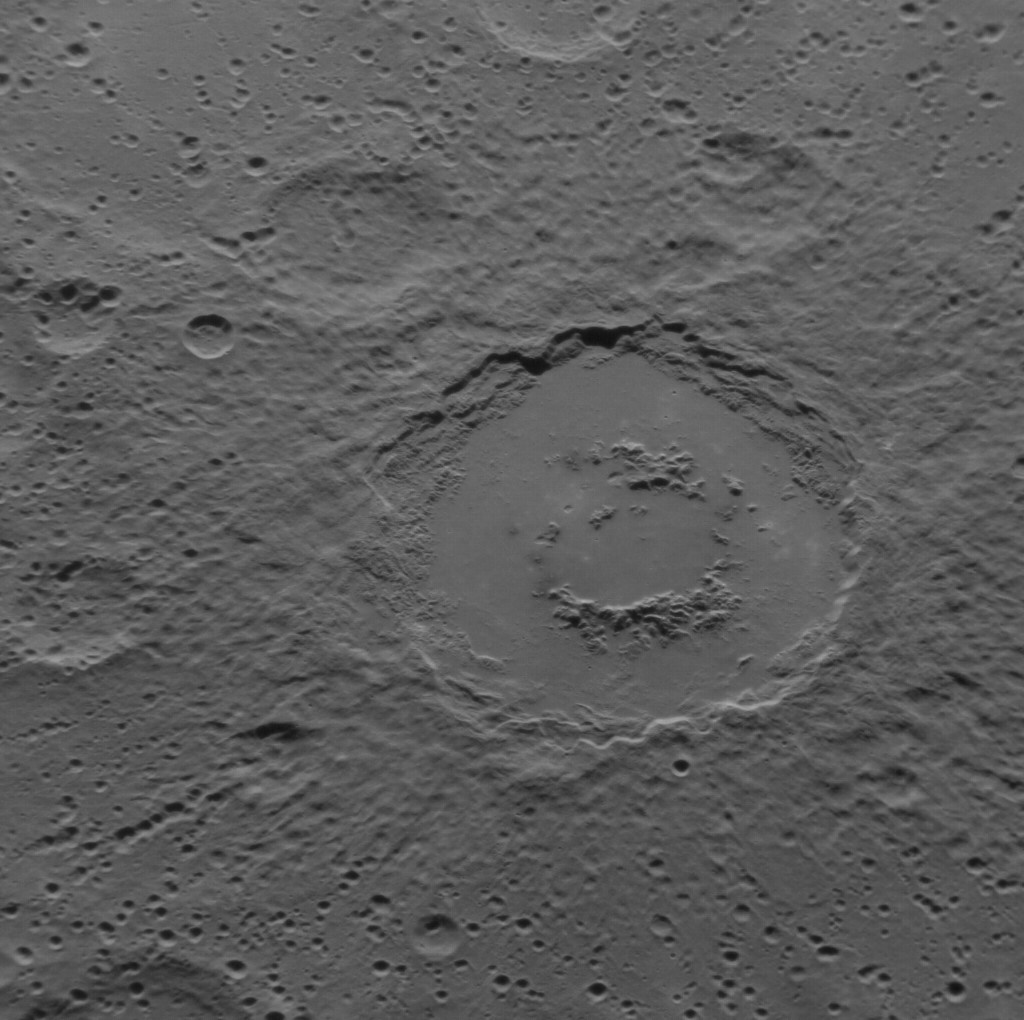
- MESSENGER image
- Feature type: Peak-ring impact basin
- Location: Bach quadrangle, Mercury
- Coordinates: 66.97°S 77.25°E
- Diameter: 151.49 km (94.13 mi)
- Eponym: Betti Alver

Alver is a crater on Mercury. It has a diameter of 151.49 kilometers. Its name was adopted by the International Astronomical Union (IAU) on March 15, 2013. Alver is named for the Estonian poet Betti Alver.

Alver is one of 110 peak ring basins on Mercury. It lies in southern Utaridi Planitia.

On the western side of the peak ring is a dark spot of low reflectance material (LRM), closely associated with hollows. At least four irregular depressions are present in the vicinity of the northwestern peak ring. These depressions are evidence of explosive volcanism on the floor of the crater.

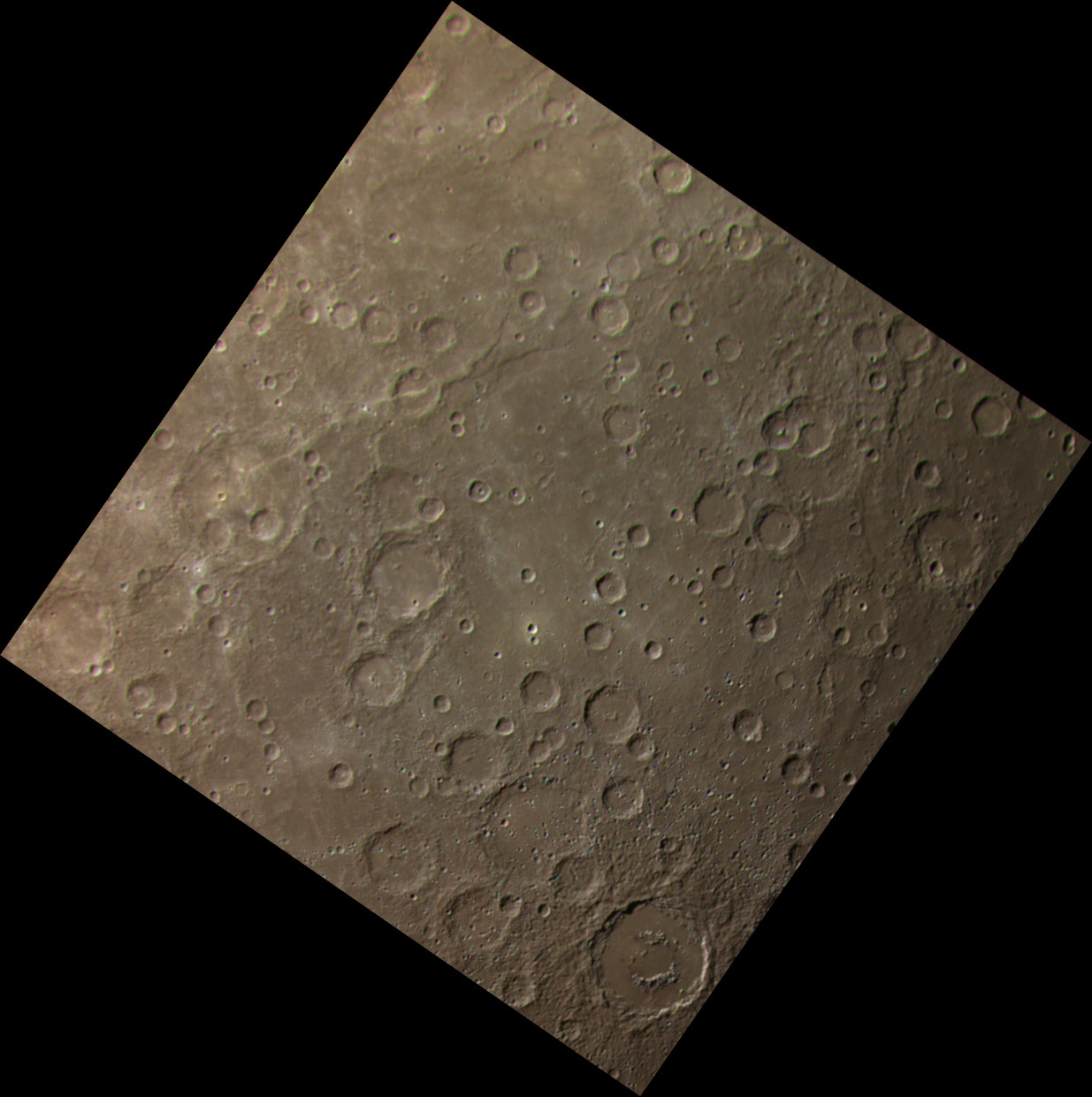
Exaggerated color image with Alver at bottom center

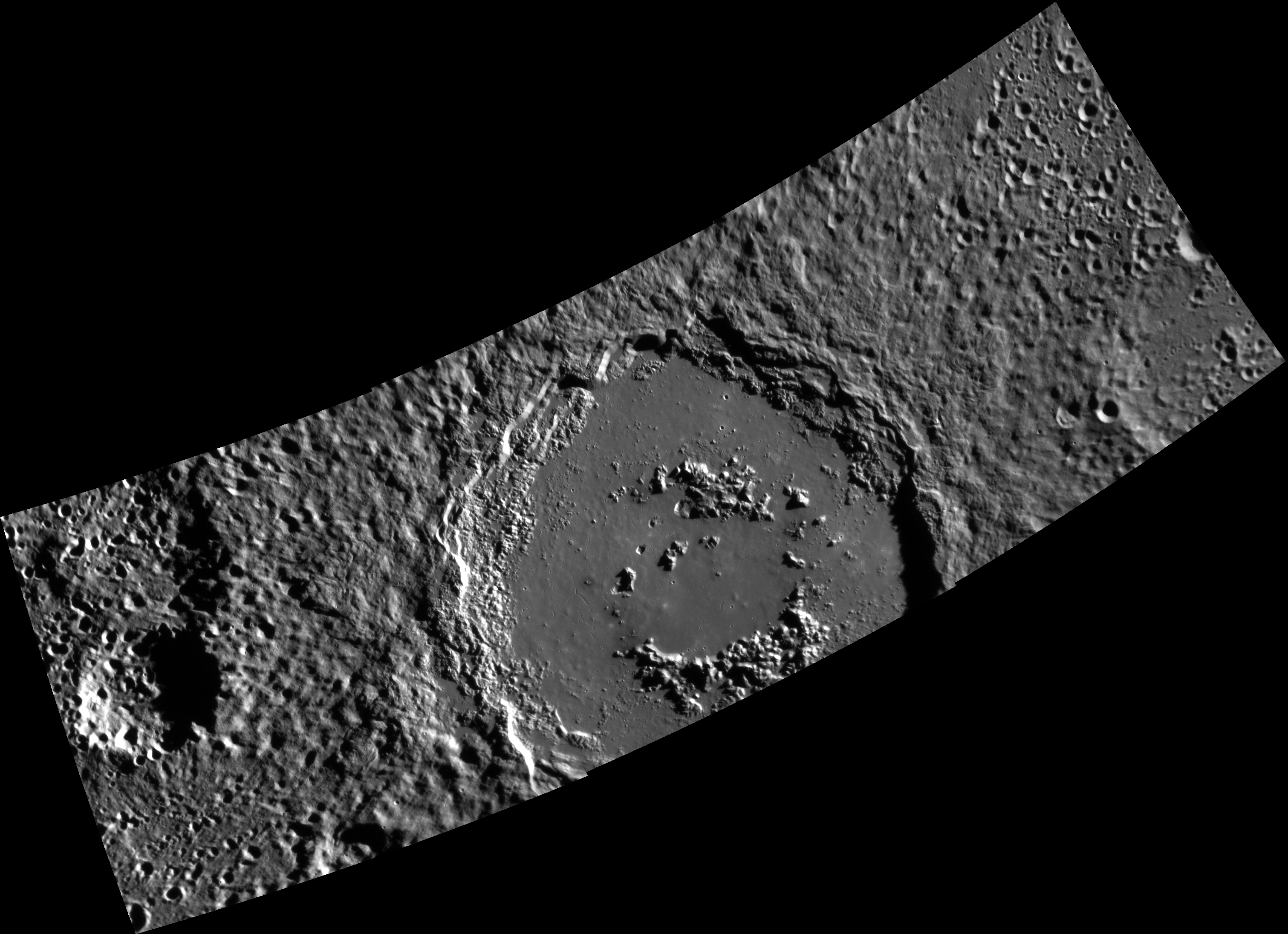
Detail of Alver crater
