= Köksal Alver =

Turkish sociologist

Koksal Alver
- Born: 1970 (age 55–56); Narman, Turkey

Academic background
- Education: Istanbul University

Academic work
- Discipline: Sociology
- Institutions: Selçuk University

Koksal Alver is a Turkish author who was born in Narman, a town and district of Erzurum, Turkey in 1970. His works primarily concern cultural dynamics, sociology of space and rural sociology. His literary works are inspired by traditional Ottoman poetry, which he composes in his own narrative styles.

== Education and career ==
After completing high school education in the town, Alver studied sociology at Istanbul University. Alver began his academic career at the Faculty of Literature, Selçuk Üniversitesi, Konya and became a professor at the university.

Alver lectures on the topics of sociology, literature, art, culture, urban, and dynamics of place in the society. Alver became an editor for the journal Sosyoloji Divanı and holds an editorial board position for the cultural magazine Mahalle Mektabi which is based in Konya.

== Appreciation ==
He started to write about literature when he was at university. His first story was published on Yedi İklim journal in 1993. He published his essays and stories in Hece and Heceöykü journals. He was actively engaged in the fields of literature sociology, novel sociology and cultural sociology.

“Köksal Alver has a refined narration. He uses a clean and simple Turkish. Love of Istanbul, love of folk songs and books can be seen in his stories. His pure and humble narration and the themes chosen from life represent Esendal. The problems of young person migrated from rural town to the city, the friendships at the city, social problems are his areas of interest.” (Necip Tosun)

“If we consider that the first thing modernity does is to dissolve the “affiliation” ties, we can see that the current age makes it possible to simultaneously conduct re-establishing affiliation ties with the concern of existence. As Köksal Alver moves with space, he determines his story at this point. The guidance of spaces caused him to be bound into “these lands” in Saklı Yara (...) The theme of Saklı Yara, the narrator and utilization of space are harmonious within this scope. Space means balance with existence.” (Ercan Yıldırım)

== Works ==
- The Hidden Wound (Saklı Yara, story, 2004)
- Sociology of Literature (Edebiyat Sosyolojisi, editor, 2004);
- On Sociology of Literature (Edebiyat Sosyolojisi İncelemeleri, editor, 2004);
- Sociology of Culture (Kültür Sosyolojisi, 2007);
- The Urban Lives: Disparate Space and Secure Sites in the city (Siteril Hayatlar: Kentte Mekânsal Ayrışma ve Güvenlikli Siteler, 2007);
- Çevgen (story, 2011);
- Urban Sociology (Kent Sosyolojisi, 2012);
- Guide to Sociology Readings (Sosyoloji Okumaları Kılavuzu, 2012);
- Mahalle: Social and Spatial Portrait of The Neighborhood (Mahalle: Mahallenin Toplumsal ve Mekânsal Portresi, 2013);
- Excuse (Bahane, story, 2015);
- Imaginations and Things (Haller Hayaller, 2016)
