= Debussy quadrangle =

Quadrangle on Mercury

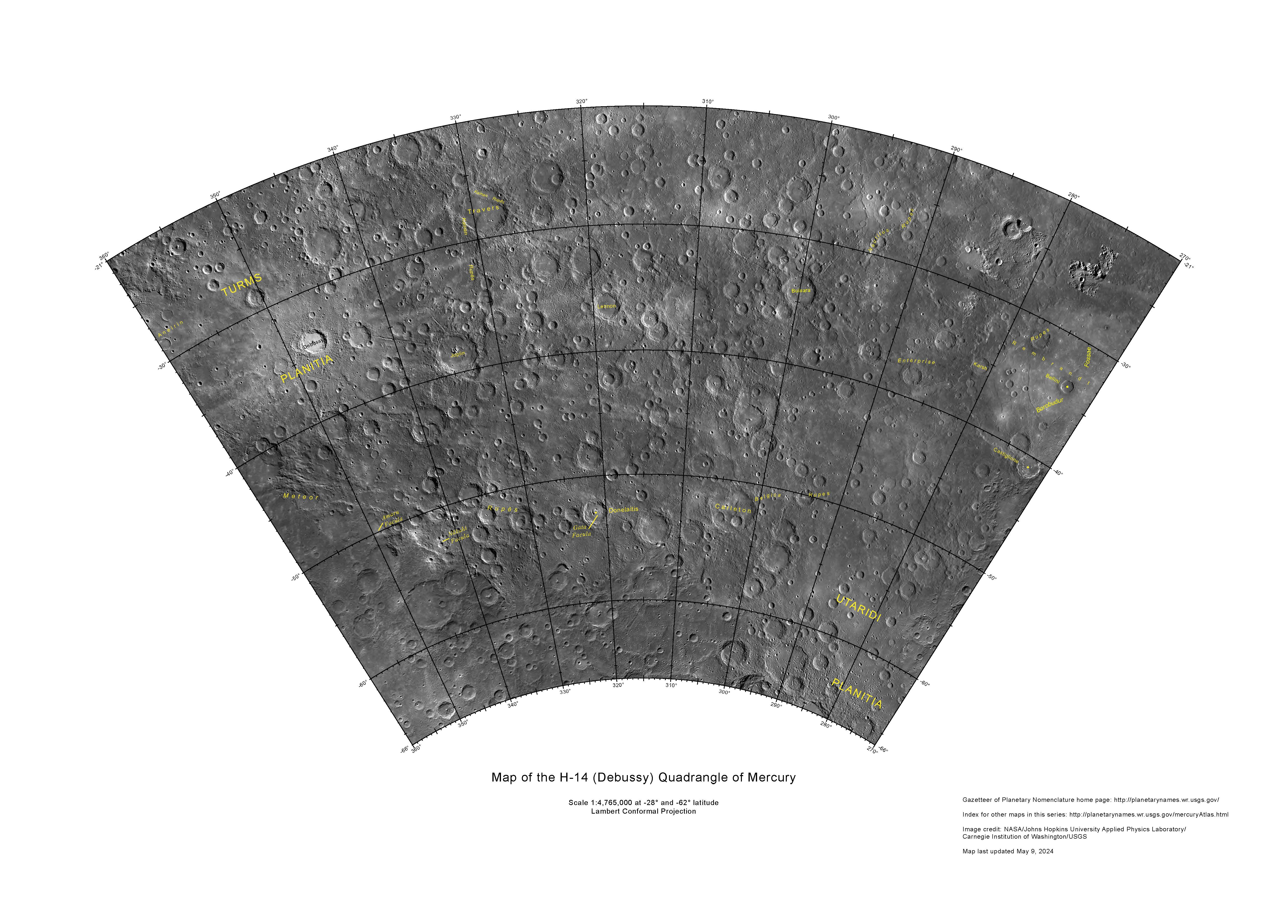
Debussy quadrangle as mapped by the MESSENGER spacecraft

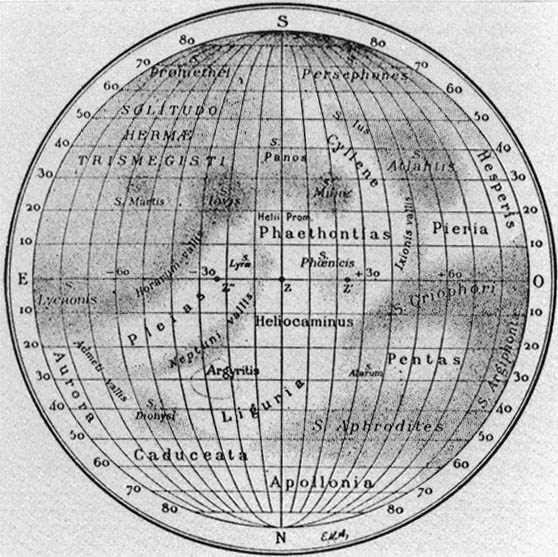
1934 map showing the Cyllene albedo feature

The Debussy quadrangle (H-14) is one of fifteen quadrangles on Mercury. It runs from 270 to 360° longitude and from -20 to -70° latitude. Named after the Debussy crater, it was mapped in detail for the first time after MESSENGER entered orbit around Mercury in 2011. It had not been mapped prior to that point because it was one of the six quadrangles that was not illuminated when Mariner 10 made its flybys in 1974 and 1975. These six quadrangles continued to be known by their albedo feature names, with this one known as the Cyllene quadrangle.

In addition to the prominent Debussy crater, the western half of the Rembrandt basin is within the quadrangle. Rembrandt is the second-largest impact basin on Mercury, after Caloris. The eastern half of Rembrandt is in the Neruda quadrangle.

The Bach quadrangle is south of Debussy quadrangle. To the west is Discovery quadrangle, and to the east is Neruda quadrangle. To the north is Derain quadrangle, and to the northeast is Eminescu quadrangle.

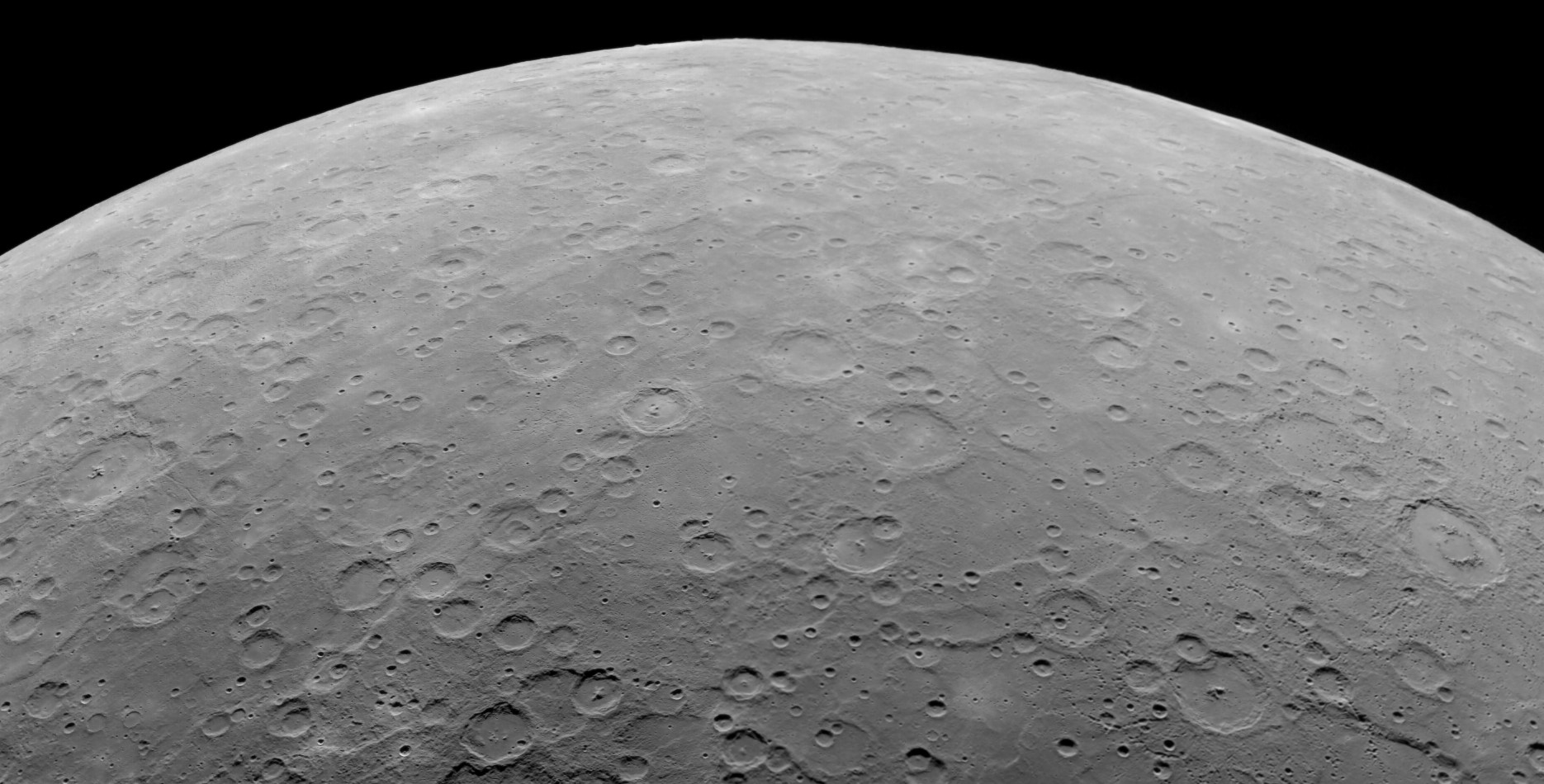
Oblique view of Mercury showing most of Debussy quadrangle

== Geological history ==
H-1 Borealis (features)
H-5 Hokusai (features)	H-4 Raditladi (features)	H-3 Shakespeare (features)		H-2 Victoria (features)
H-10 Derain (features)	H-9 Eminescu (features)	H-8 Tolstoj (features)	H-7 Beethoven (features)	H-6 Kuiper (features)
H-14 Debussy (features)	H-13 Neruda (features)	H-12 Michelangelo (features)		H-11 Discovery (features)
H-15 Bach (features)
