= Neruda quadrangle =

Quadrangle on Mercury

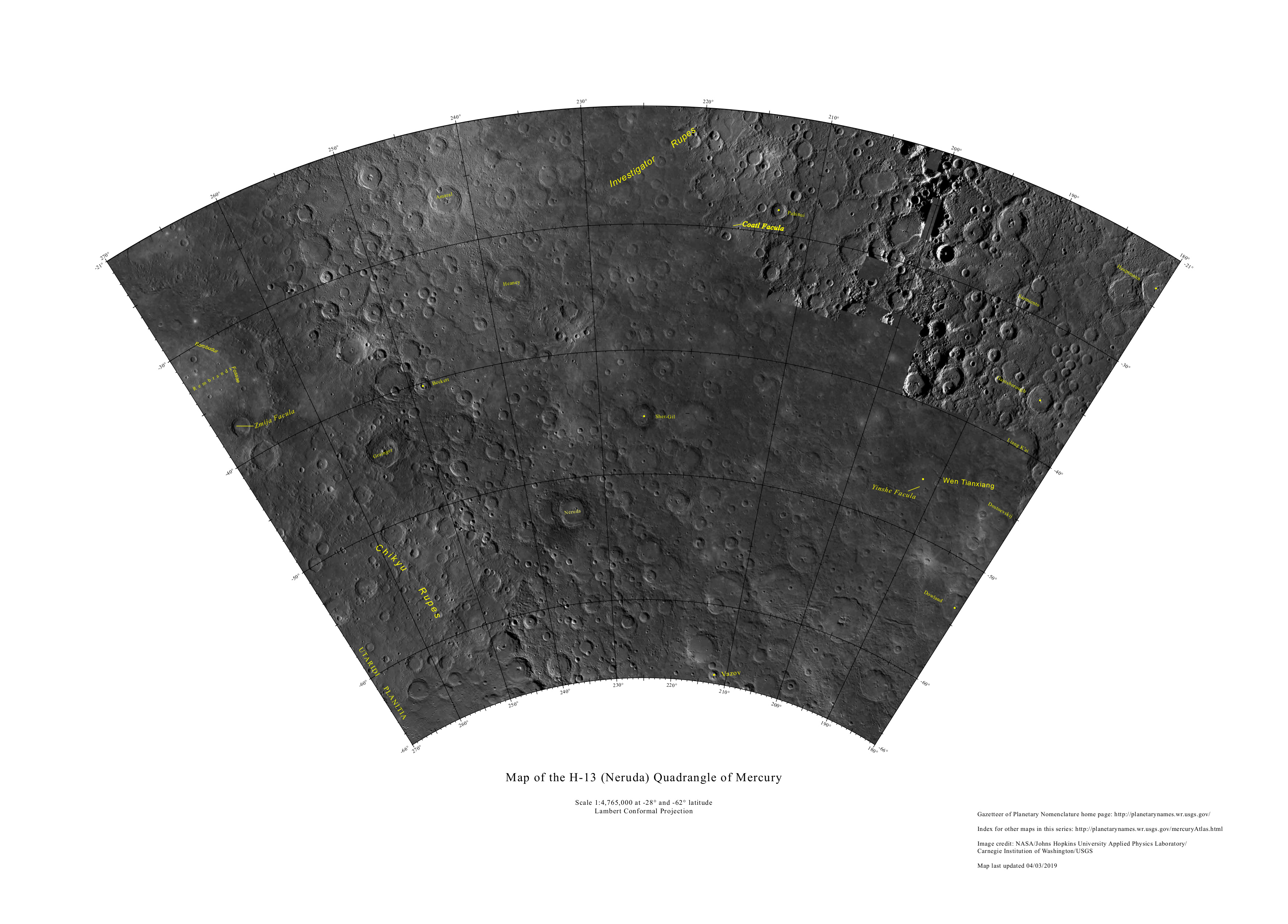
Neruda quadrangle as mapped by the MESSENGER spacecraft

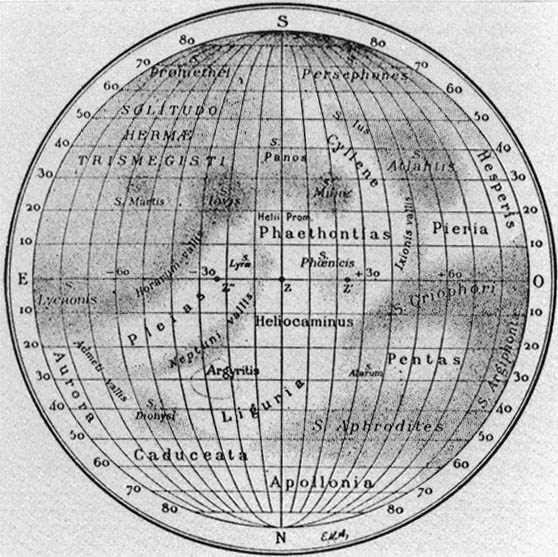
1934 map showing the Solitudo Persephones albedo feature

The Neruda quadrangle (H-13) is one of fifteen quadrangles on Mercury. It runs from 180 to 270° longitude and -20 to -70° latitude. Named after the Neruda crater, it was mapped in detail for the first time after MESSENGER entered orbit around Mercury in 2011. It had not been mapped prior to that point because it was one of the six quadrangles that was not illuminated (with the exception of a narrow strip along the eastern border with the Michelangelo quadrangle) when Mariner 10 made its flybys in 1974 and 1975. These six quadrangles continued to be known by their albedo feature names, with this one known as the Solitudo Persephones quadrangle.

In addition to Neruda crater, the eastern half of the Rembrandt basin is within the quadrangle. Rembrandt is the second-largest impact basin on Mercury, after Caloris. The western half of Rembrandt is in the Debussy quadrangle.

The Bach quadrangle is south of Neruda quadrangle. To the west is Debussy quadrangle, and to the east is Michelangelo quadrangle. To the northwest is Eminescu quadrangle, and to the northeast is Tolstoj quadrangle.

== Geological history ==
H-1 Borealis (features)
H-5 Hokusai (features)	H-4 Raditladi (features)	H-3 Shakespeare (features)		H-2 Victoria (features)
H-10 Derain (features)	H-9 Eminescu (features)	H-8 Tolstoj (features)	H-7 Beethoven (features)	H-6 Kuiper (features)
H-14 Debussy (features)	H-13 Neruda (features)	H-12 Michelangelo (features)		H-11 Discovery (features)
H-15 Bach (features)
