= Belgica (disambiguation) =

Gallia Belgica was a province of the Roman Empire covering present-day Luxembourg and parts of France, Belgium and the Netherlands.

Belgica may also refer to:

== Places ==
- Belgica Glacier, Antarctica
- Belgica Guyot, an undersea tablemount off Antarctica
- Belgica Mountains, a mountain chain in Antarctica
- Belgica Subglacial Highlands, Antarctica
- Fort Belgica, a 17th-century fort in the Maluku Islands, Indonesia
- La Bélgica, a town in Bolivia
- Belgica Mound Province, a carbonate mound in the Porcupine Seabight
- Bélgica (Madrid Metro), a station on Line 2 of the Metro Ligero
- Belgica metro station, a station on Brussels Metro line 6, opened in 1982
- 1052 Belgica, an asteroid discovered in 1925

== People ==
=== People with the surname ===
- Greco Belgica (born 1978), Filipino politician and television host

=== People with the given name ===
- Bélgica Carmona Cabrera (born 1987), Mexican politician
- Bélgica Castro (1921–2020), Chilean actress

== Ships ==
- MV Belgica, several ships of the name
- RV Belgica, several ships of the name
  - RV Belgica (1884), a vessel that undertook the Belgian Antarctic Expedition
  - RV Belgica (A962), a research vessel built in 1984
- SS Belgica, several ships of the name

== Biological organisms ==
- Belgica (fly), a flightless midge genus of family Chironomidae
- Bela belgica, an extinct sea snail of family Mangeliidae
- Ulmus × hollandica 'Belgica', an elm variety popular throughout Belgium and the Netherlands in the 19th century

== Other uses ==
- Belgica (film), a 2016 Belgian film
- Belgica, the digital library of the Royal Library of Belgium
- Belgica, Latinized name for the female personification of the Low Countries during the Eighty Years' War

== See also ==
- Belgica Foederata, the "federal Netherlands"
- Belgica Regia, the "king's Netherlands"
- Belgium
- K.V.V. Belgica Edegem Sport, a football club based in Edegem, Belgium
- Terminology of the Low Countries
- United Belgian States
- Belgium (disambiguation)
- Belgic (disambiguation)
