= Belgique (disambiguation) =

Belgique is the French name of Belgium, a country in Europe.

Belgique may also refer to:

- Belgique, Missouri, USA
- Belgian French (Belgique, Belgian; French: français de Belgique), a dialect of the French language
- SS Belgique, a steamship, a cargo ship built in 1918 and scrapped in 1958, that carried the name "Belgique" (1946-1950)

== See also ==
- Université libre de Belgique (French: Belgium Free University), Brussels, Belgium
- French Community of Belgium (French: Communauté française de Belgique)
- Belgic (disambiguation)
- Belgica (disambiguation)
- Belgium (disambiguation)
- Belgian (disambiguation)
