= RV Belgica =

Belgica was and is the name of three Belgian research vessels, with a name derived ultimately from the Latin Gallia Belgica.

- RV Belgica (1884)
- RV Belgica (A962)

== See also ==
- SS Belgica
- New Belgica (barque) The project to recreate RV Belgica (1884) at De Steenschuit's yard in Boom, Antwerp.
- Belgica (disambiguation)
