= Belgica Glacier =

Glacier in Antarctica

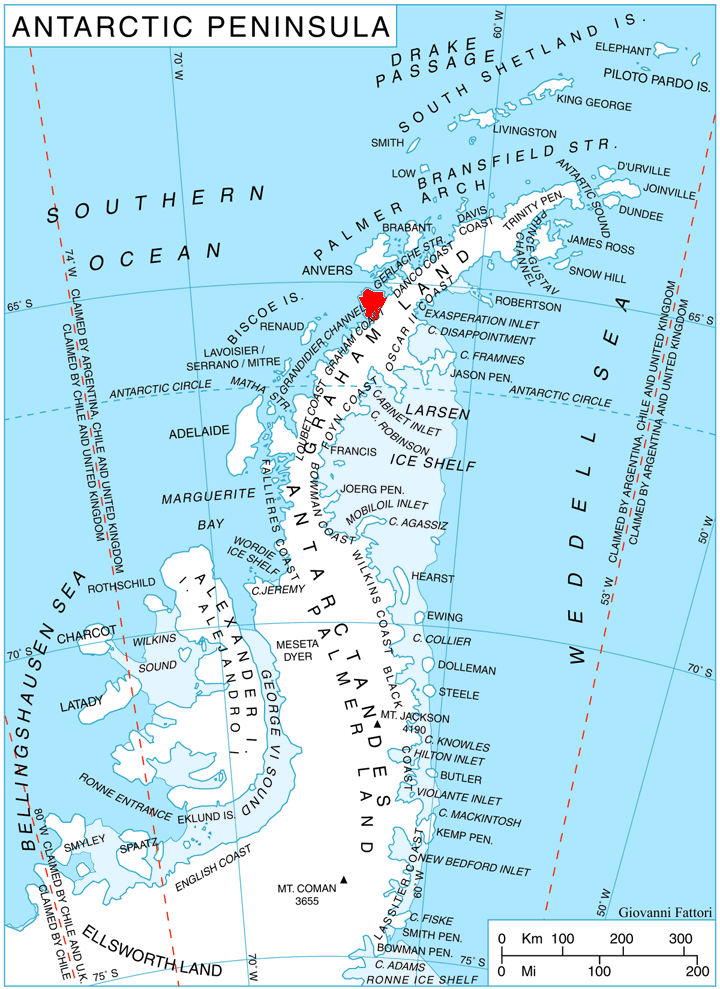
- Location of Kyiv Peninsula in Graham Land, Antarctic Peninsula

- Location within Antarctica
- Location: Graham Land
- Coordinates: 65°23′00″S 63°50′00″W
- Length: 8 nmi (15 km; 9 mi)
- Thickness: unknown
- Highest elevation: 273 m (896 ft)
- Terminus: Trooz Glacier
- Status: unknown

Belgica Glacier (65°23′S 63°50′W) is a glacier 8 nautical miles (15 km) long, flowing into Trooz Glacier to the east of Lancaster Hill on Kyiv Peninsula, on the west coast of Graham Land. It was first charted by the British Graham Land Expedition under John Rymill, 1934–37, and named by the UK Antarctic Place-Names Committee in 1959 after the RV Belgica, the ship of the Belgian Antarctic Expedition under Gerlache which explored this area in 1897–99.

== See also ==
- List of glaciers in the Antarctic
- Glaciology
