= Belgic =

Belgic may refer to:

- an adjective referring to the Belgae, an ancient confederation of Celto-Germanic tribes
- a rarer adjective referring to the Low Countries or to Belgium
- SS Belgic, several ships with the name
- Belgic ware, a type of pottery
- Belgic Confession, a Christian doctrinal standard

== See also ==
- Belgique (disambiguation)
- Belgica (disambiguation)
- Belgian (disambiguation)
- Belgium (disambiguation)
