= Belgica metro station =

Metro station in Brussels, Belgium

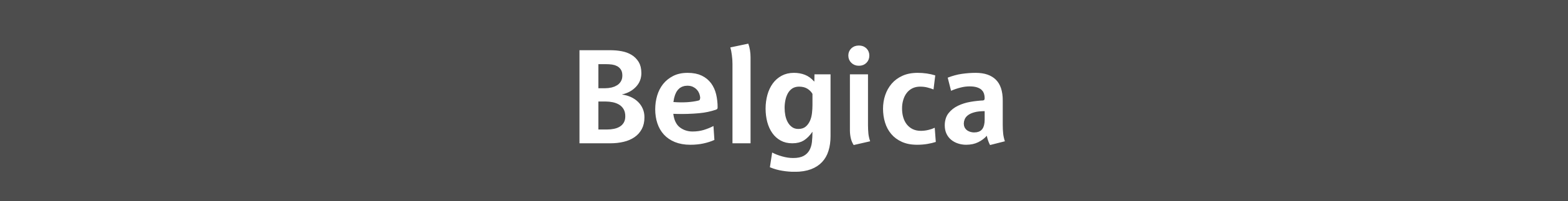

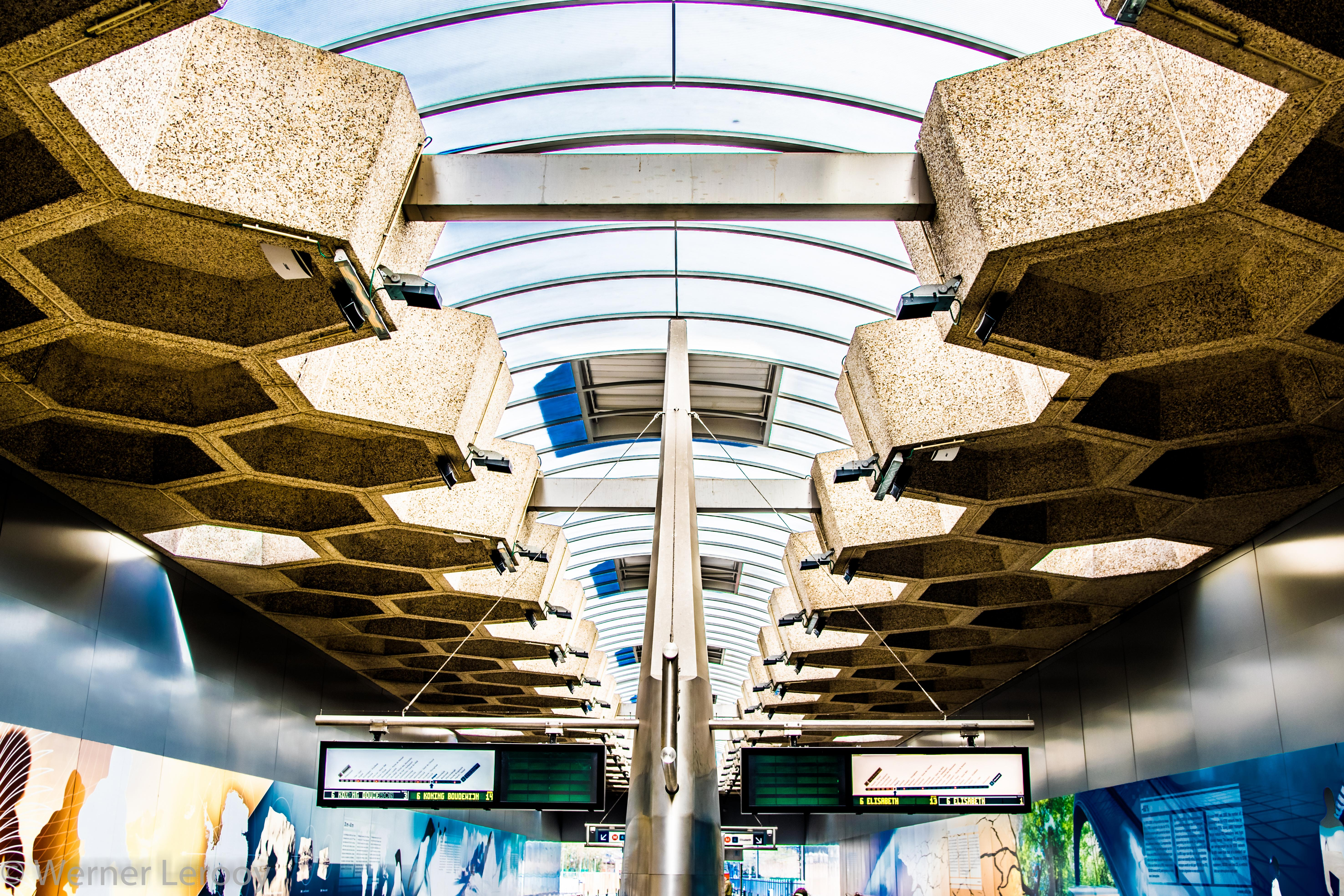
- Belgica metro station

General information
- Location: Boulevard Belgica / Belgicalaan; 1090 Jette, Brussels-Capital Region, Belgium
- Coordinates: 50°52′04″N 4°20′10″E
- Owner: STIB/MIVB
- Platforms: 1 island platform
- Tracks: 2

Construction
- Structure type: Below grade

History
- Opened: 6 October 1982; 44 years ago

Services
Preceding station	Brussels Metro	Following station
Simonis towards Elisabeth	Line 6	Pannenhuis towards King Baudouin
Location

Belgica is a Brussels Metro station on the northern branch of line 6. It is located in the municipality of Jette, in the north-west of Brussels, Belgium. The station received its name from the aboveground Boulevard Belgica/Belgicalaan, itself named in honour of RV Belgica, the ship that carried the first Belgian polar expedition to the Antarctic in 1897.

The metro station opened on 6 October 1982 as part of the Beekkant–Bockstael extension of former line 1A. Then, following the reorganisation of the Brussels Metro on 4 April 2009, it is served by line 6.

In May 2024, Brussels Mobility and the Brussels Intercommunal Transport Company (STIB/MIVB) applied for a permit to build a new tram line connecting Belgica with Brussels-North railway station.

== See also ==
- Transport in Brussels
- History of Brussels
