= Collins Bay (disambiguation) =

Collins Bay may refer to:

- Collins Bay Institution, Canadian correctional facility
- Collins Bay, Ontario, Community and natural harbour in Kingston, Ontario, Canada
- Collins Bay Airport (ICAO: CYKC), airport in Saskatchewan, Canada
- Collins Bay, Bay in Antarctica
