= Arnaldo Faustini =

Italian geographer, cartographer and writer

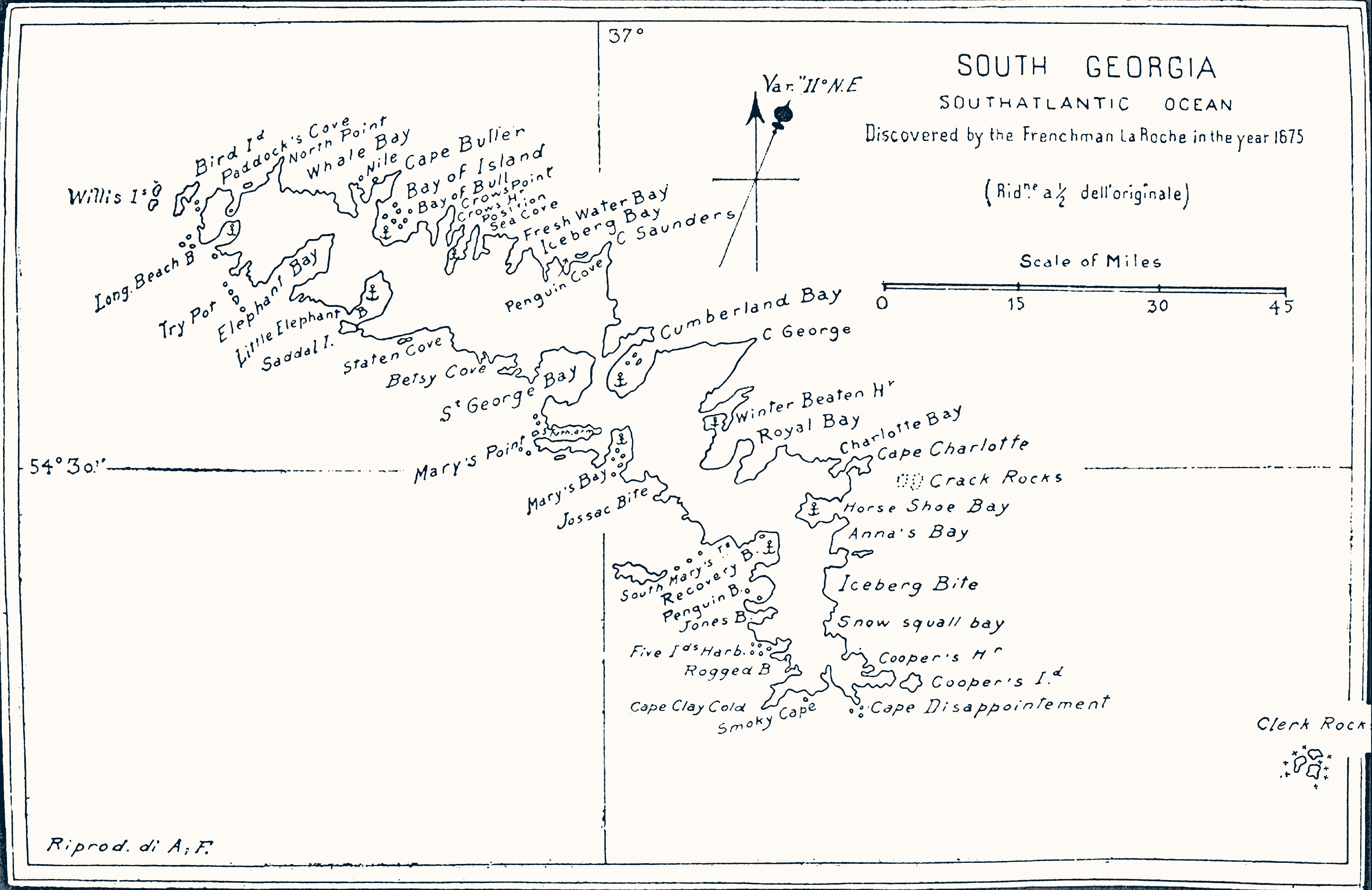
Faustini’s reproduction of the 1802 map of the Antarctic island of South Georgia by Capt. Isaac Pendleton

Arnaldo Faustini (1872–1944) was an Italian polar geographer, writer, and cartographer. He is considered by some to be the first Westen European polar specialist. Born in Rome, he received his doctorate from the University of Rome at the age of 19. Faustini worked at a newspaper based in Rome as scientific editor. He had a special interest in polar subjects, and published 19 books on polar subjects in his native Italian. He also wrote numerous articles.

Among the polar explorers Faustini knew personally were Roald Amundsen, Ernest Shackleton, Robert F. Scott, and Adrien de Gerlache, of the Belgian Antarctic Expedition. Faustini translated into Italian De Gerlache's French language account of his voyage. Faustini also drew the map of the area explored by the Belgians. In gratitude, De Gerlache gave him the flag from the expedition's ship, the SS Belgica.

The polar explorer Augustus Greely invited Faustini to the United States in 1915 for a lecture tour. While lecturing at Columbia University, Faustini met Amelia Del Colle, who later became his wife.

Faustini's interests were wide-ranging. In an unpublished 1918 manuscript entitled Catalogo Descrittivo di Ponti ed Archi Naturali ("Descriptive Catalog of Natural Bridges and Arches”), Faustini wrote: "Completed under every standpoint, for a future, eventual publication – text, topographical sketches, illustrations, contents, indexes, etc., that I think to be my greatest work of physical geography." He was fluent in French, English, Spanish and Russian and understood Greek.

The crater Faustini on the Moon is named after him. His papers on the Arctic and Antarctic are held in the Archives of the Istituto Geografico Polare "Silvio Zavatti" (Zavatti Polar Institute) in Fermo.

== Sources ==
- (in English)"The annals of Tristan da Cunha". Archived from the original on 2006-11-13.
- (in English) Arnaldo Faustini: Arch Pioneer, by David Brandt-Erichsen
