= SS Martha Hendrik Fisser =

A number of steamships were named Martha Hendrik Fisser, including –

- SS Martha Hendrik Fisser (1911), a German cargo ship in service 1935–40
- SS Martha Hendrik Fisser (1918), a West German cargo ship in service 1950–58
