= Pannenhuis metro station =

Metro station in Brussels, Belgium

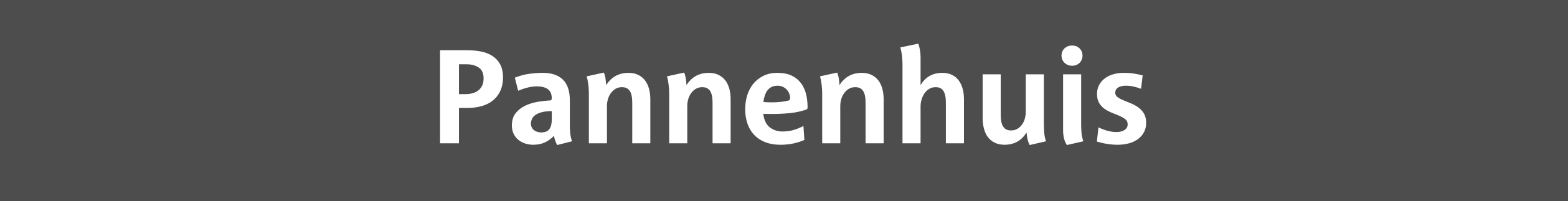

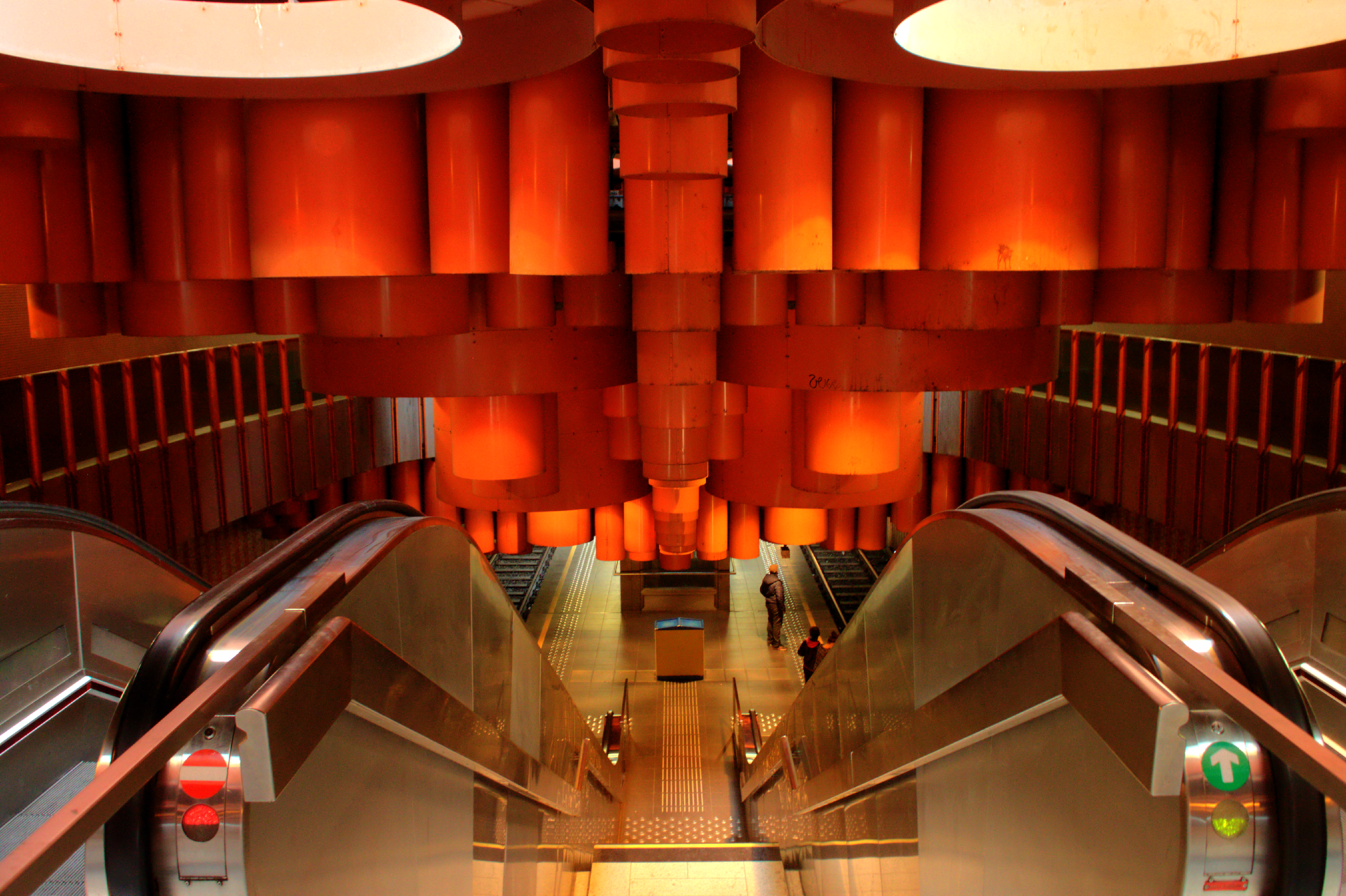
- Pannenhuis metro station

General information
- Location: Rue Charles Demeer / Charles Demeerstraat; 1020 Laeken, City of Brussels, Brussels-Capital Region, Belgium
- Coordinates: 50°52′22″N 4°20′31″E
- Owner: STIB/MIVB
- Platforms: 1 island platform
- Tracks: 2

Construction
- Structure type: Below grade

History
- Opened: 6 October 1982; 43 years ago

Services
Preceding station	Brussels Metro	Following station
Belgica towards Elisabeth	Line 6	Bockstael towards King Baudouin
Location

Pannenhuis (French pronunciation: [panənœjs]; (Note: The name Pannenhuis comes from Dutch, so its French pronunciation does not (exactly) match the French orthography. See also Koekelberg and Schaerbeek.) Dutch pronunciation: [ˈpɑnə(n)ˌɦœys]) is a Brussels Metro station on the northern branch of line 6. It is located in Laeken, in the north-west of the City of Brussels, Belgium. The station takes its name from the street Rue du Pannenhuys/Pannenhuisstraat (lit. 'Roof Tile House Street' (Note: The street name "Pannenhuis" means "roof tile house" in Dutch and is named after a pub with a tiled roof.)), which is just to the west, in the municipality of Jette.

The metro station opened on 6 October 1982 as part of the Beekkant–Bockstael extension of former line 1A. Then, following the reorganisation of the Brussels Metro on 4 April 2009, it is served by line 6.

== See also ==
- Transport in Brussels
- History of Brussels
