= Donelaitis (crater) =

Crater on Mercury

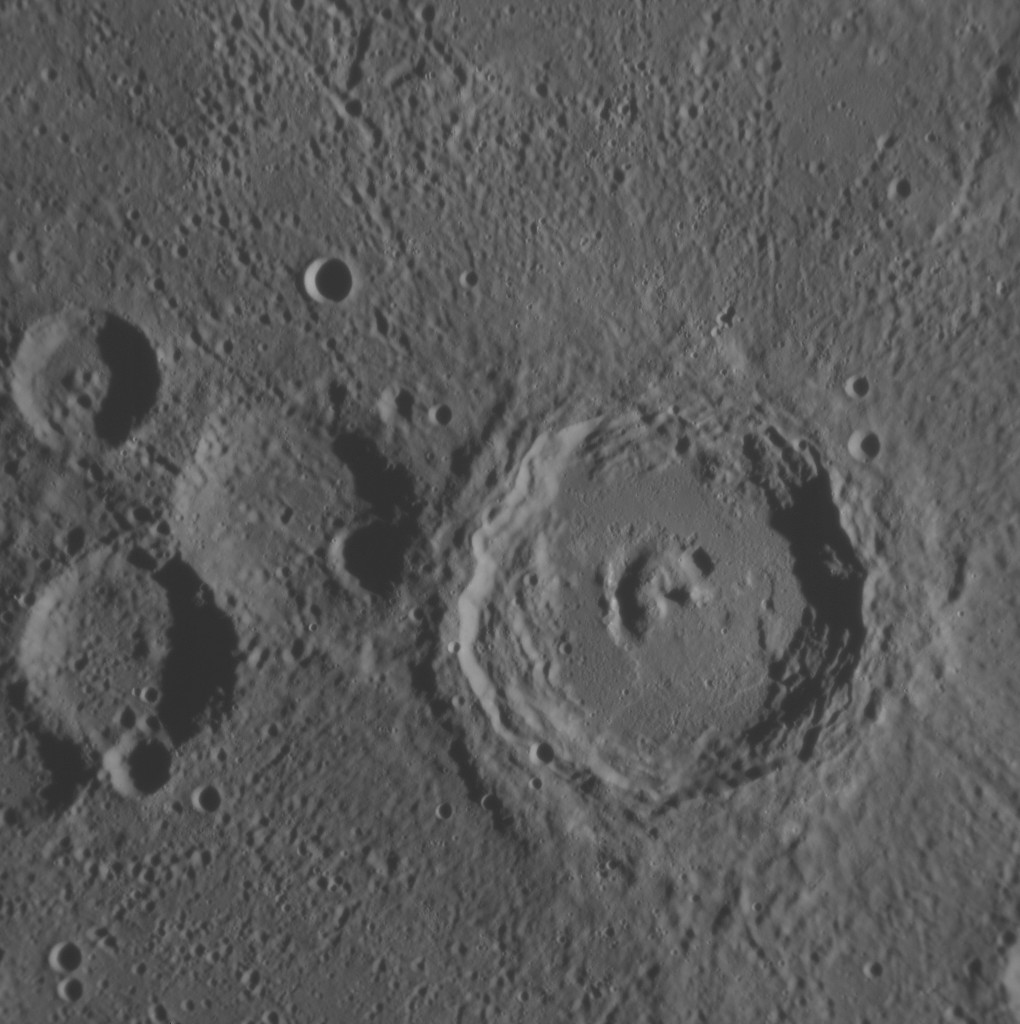
- MESSENGER NAC image of Donelaitis, slightly right of center
- Feature type: Central-peak impact crater
- Location: Debussy quadrangle, Mercury
- Coordinates: 52.96°S 321.58°W
- Diameter: 85 km (53 mi)
- Eponym: Kristijonas Donelaitis

Donelaitis is a crater on Mercury. Its name was adopted by the International Astronomical Union (IAU) on May 15, 2013. Donelaitis is named for the Lithuanian poet Kristijonas Donelaitis.

Around the central peak of Donelaitis crater is an irregular, U-shaped depression. The depression is similar to those within Navoi, Lermontov, Scarlatti, and Praxiteles. The depressions resemble those associated with explosive volcanism. The irregular bright area of the crater floor including the depression was named Gata Facula in 2018.

The crater Carleton is to the east. Some of the rays of Debussy crater to the northwest extend to the region of Donelaitis.

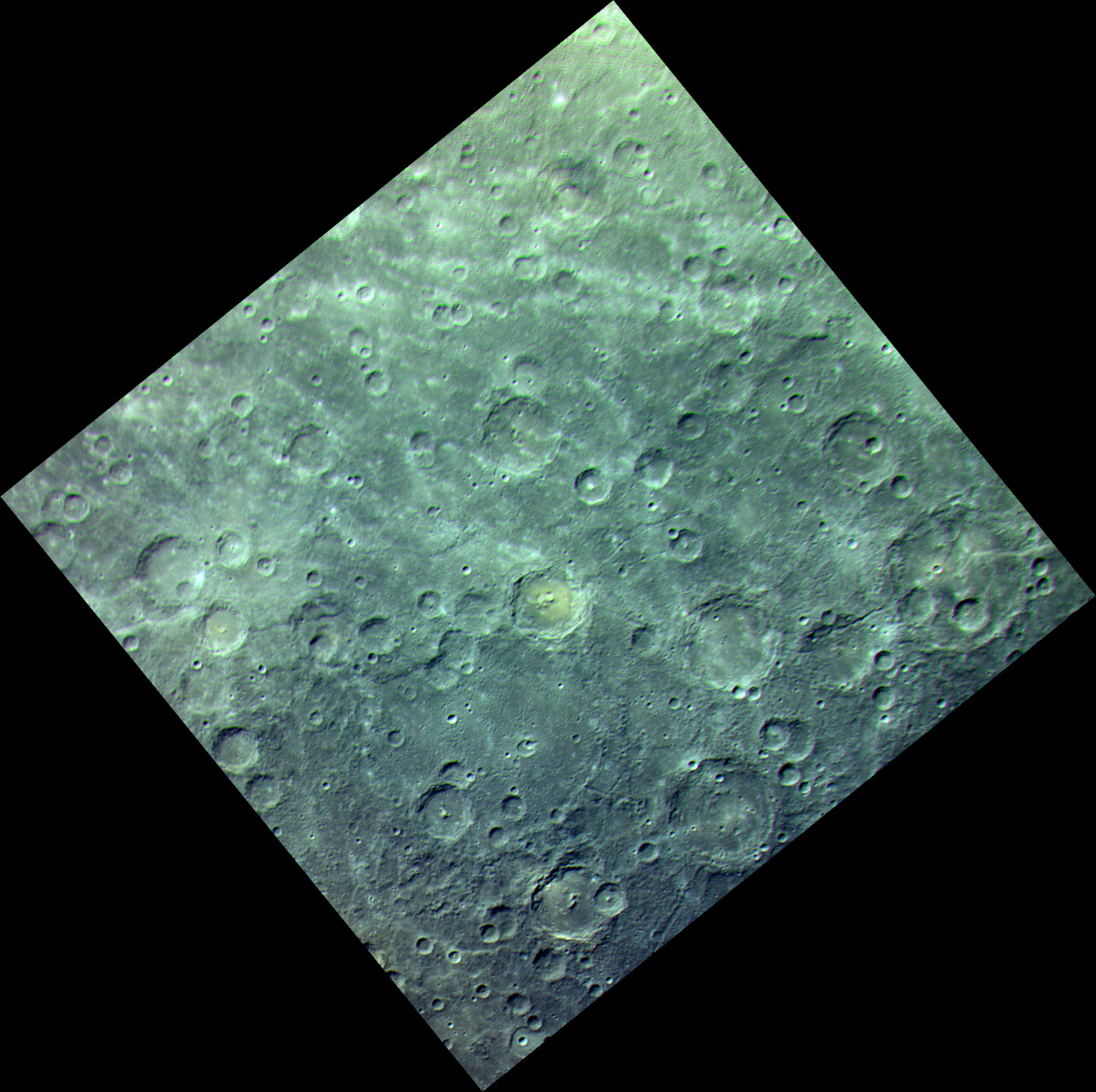
Exaggerated color view with Donelaitis at center. Yellow color indicates Gata Facula.

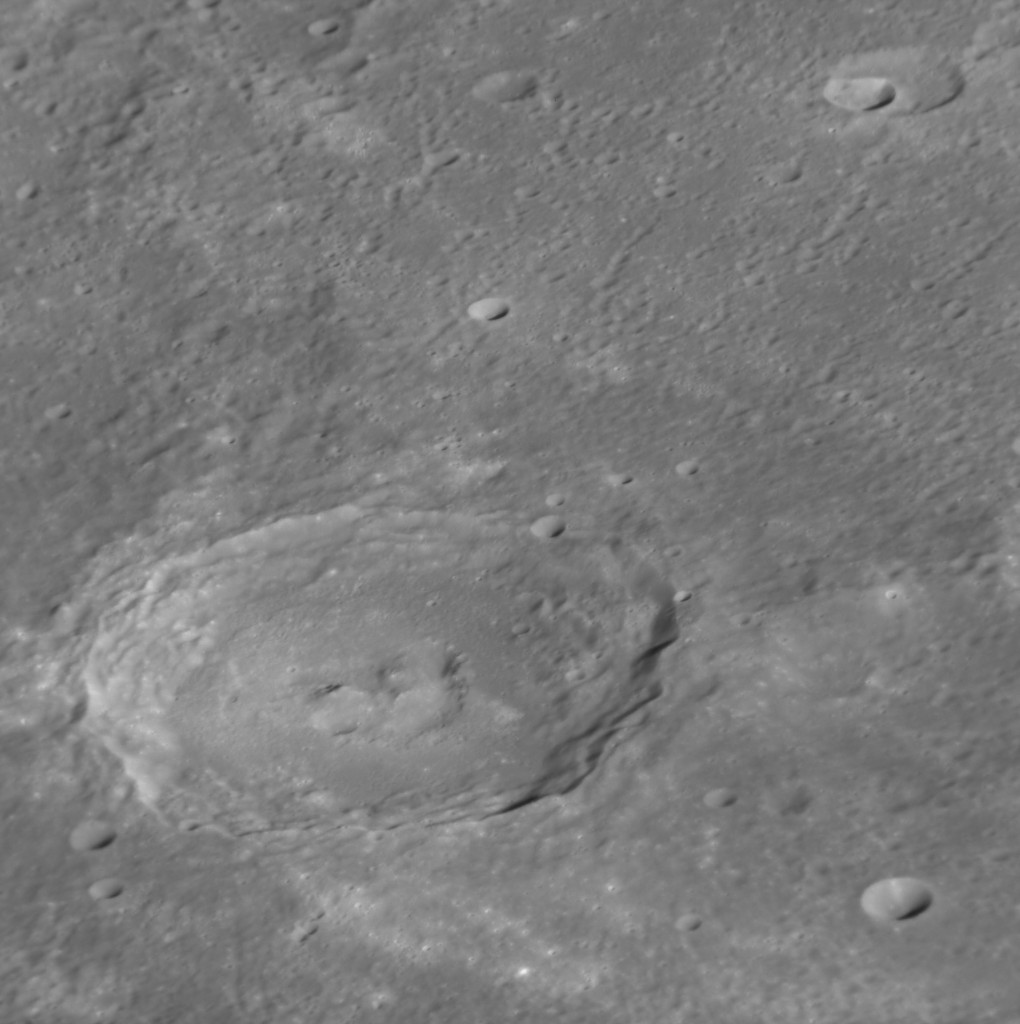
Oblique view looking south

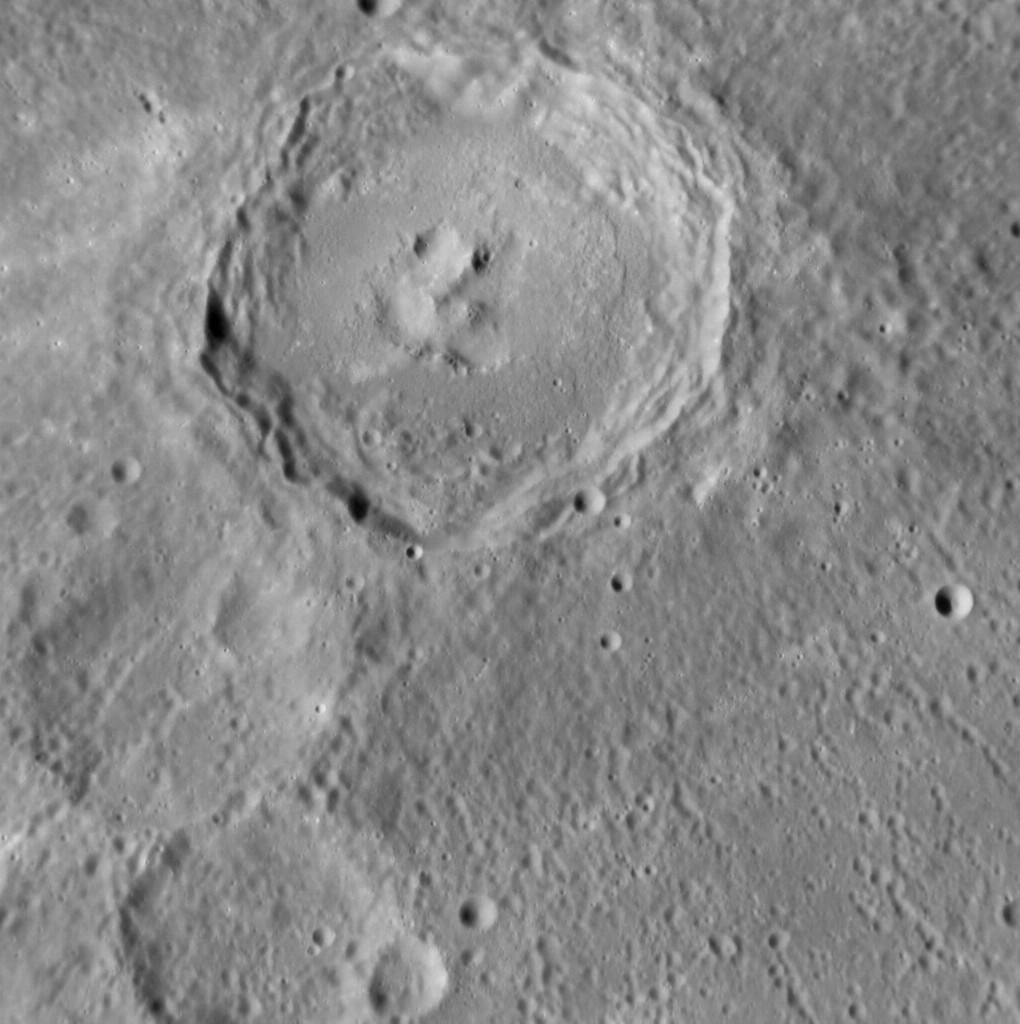
Slightly oblique view
