= Carleton (crater) =

Crater on Mercury

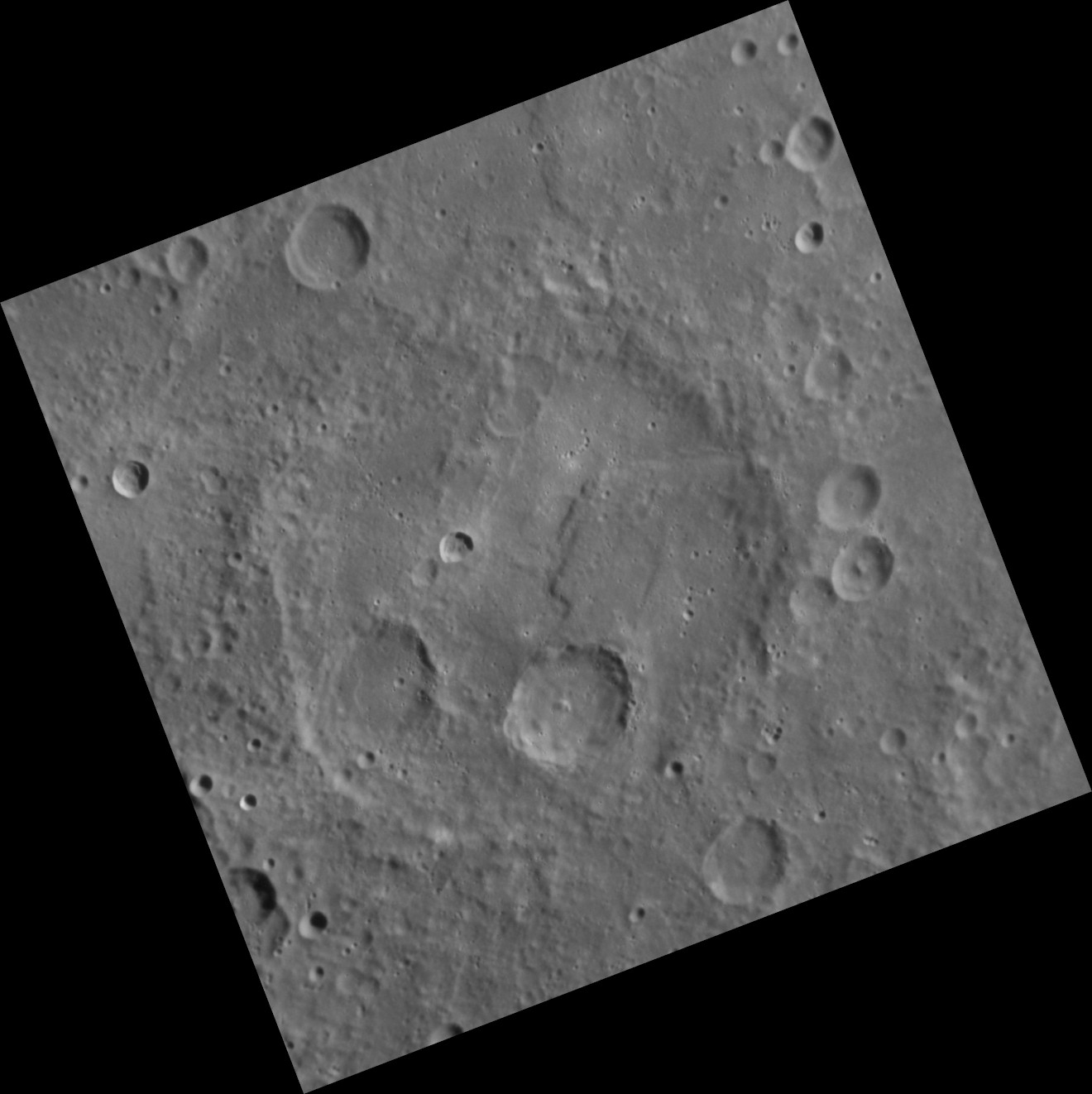
- MESSENGER NAC image of Carleton
- Feature type: Impact crater
- Location: Debussy quadrangle, Mercury
- Coordinates: 52.20°S 303.4°W
- Diameter: 177 km (110 mi)
- Eponym: William Carleton

Carleton is a crater on Mercury. Its name was adopted by the International Astronomical Union (IAU) on October 19, 2018. Carleton is named for the Irish writer William Carleton.

The scarp known as Belgica Rupes cuts across Carleton and extends to the east. The crater Donelaitis is to the west and the plain Utaridi Planitia is to the east.

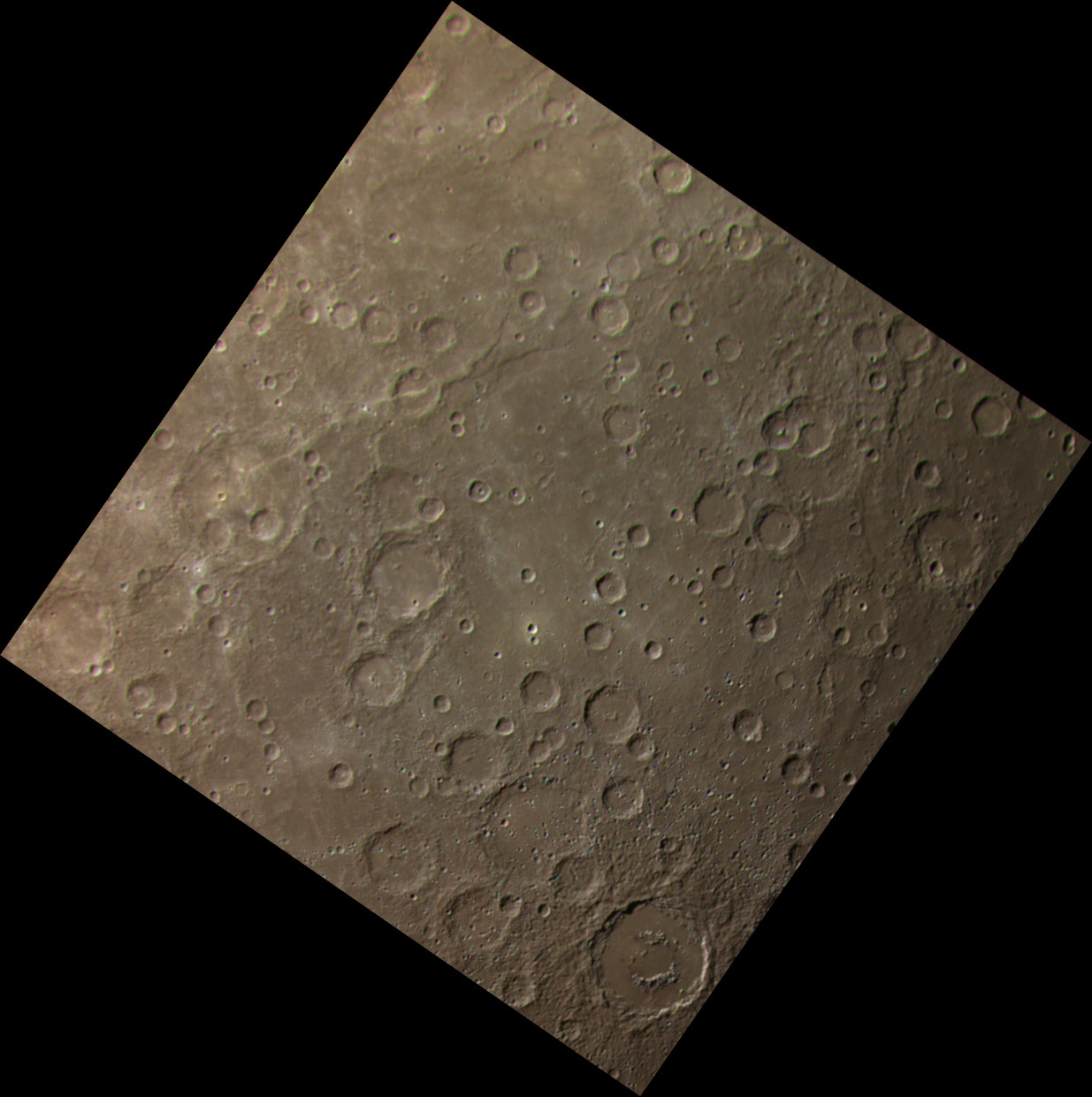
Exaggerated color image with Carleton at left

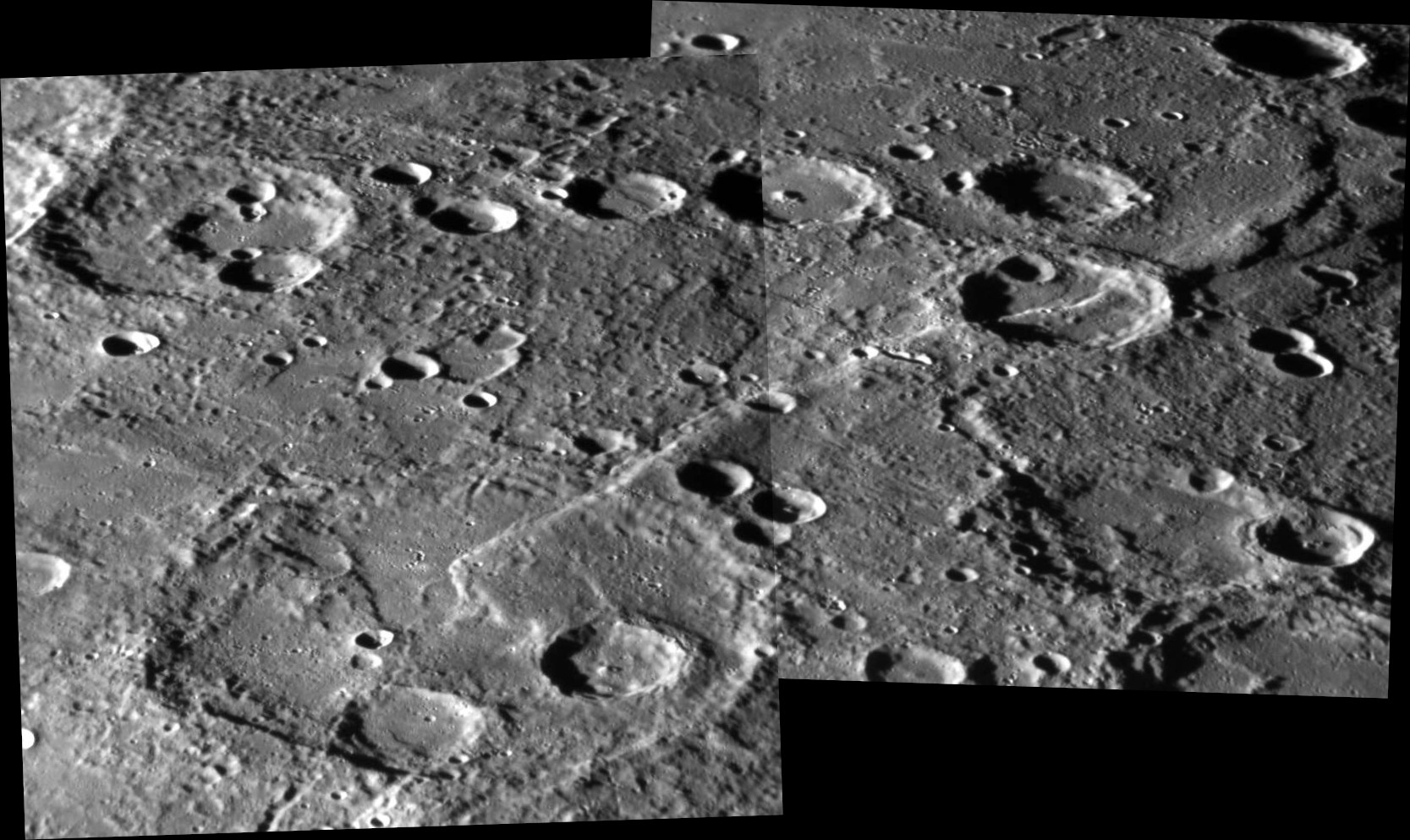
Oblique view showing Carleton in lower left and Belgica Rupes cutting across it
