= Belgica Guyot =

Undersea tablemount named for the Belgian research ship Belgica

Belgica Guyot (65°30′S 90°30′W) is an undersea tablemount named for the Belgian research ship Belgica, used in the first Belgian Antarctic Expedition (1896–1899). The name was proposed by Dr. Rick Hagen of the Alfred Wegener Institute for Polar and Marine Research, Bremerhaven, Germany, and approved by the Advisory Committee for Undersea Features in June, 1997. The minimal recorded depth is 380m.
