= Cape Pérez =

Headland in Antarctica

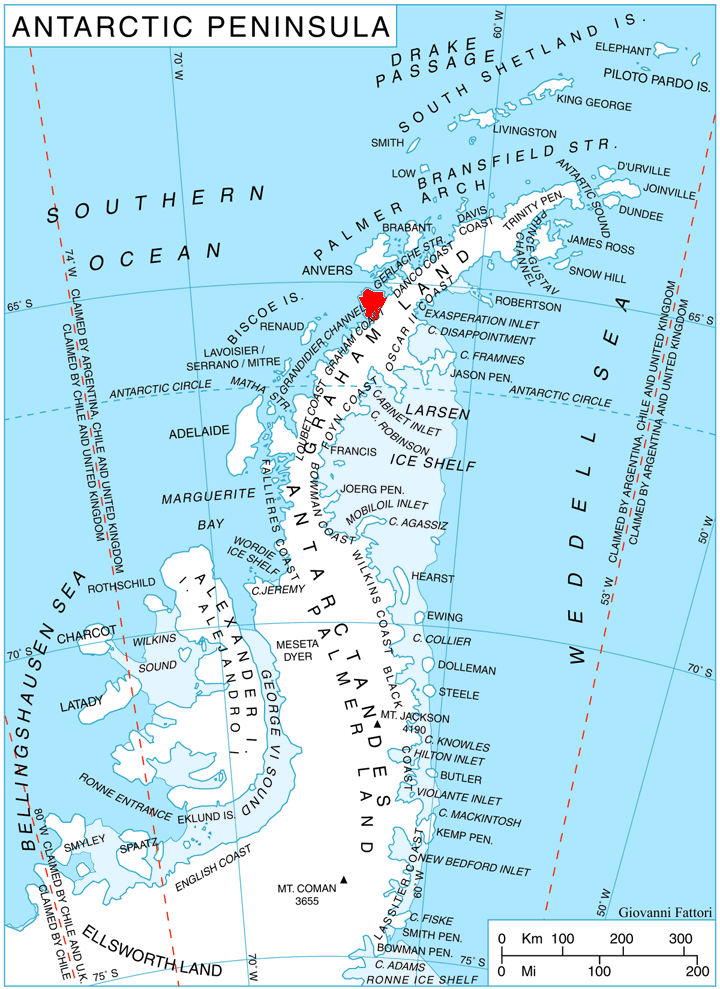
Location of Kyiv Peninsula in Graham Land, Antarctic Peninsula.

Cape Pérez (65°24′S 64°6′W) is a prominent cape between Collins Bay and Beascochea Bay on Kyiv Peninsula, the west coast of Graham Land. It was discovered by the Belgian Antarctic Expedition, 1897–99, under Adrien de Gerlache, but apparently not named by them until about 1904, when in working up their scientific reports they gave it the name Trooz. In the meantime, Charcot's French Antarctic Expedition, 1903–05, left for the Antarctic and in November 1904 resighted the same cape, to which they gave the name Trois Pérez, for the brothers Fernando, Leopoldo and Manuel Pérez of Buenos Aires. Maurice Bongrain in his report of 1914 acknowledges the Belgian name Trooz for this cape. However, the Advisory Committee on Antarctic Names has retained the Charcot name because of wider usage, and has given the name Trooz to the large glacier 5 nautical miles (9.3 km) northeast of Cape Pérez.

== Pérez Peak ==
Pérez Peak (65°25′S 64°5′W) is a distinctive peak 1 nautical mile (1.9 km) southeast of Cape Pérez on Kyiv peninsula. The name Sommet du Grand Pérez was given by J.B. Charcot during the French Antarctic Expedition, 1908–10. It derived from nearby Cape Pérez. The name Pérez Peak has been established in use since 1957.
