= Institute of Marine Biology =

Soviet-Ukrainian research institute

Coordinates: 46.47608°N 30.74018°E

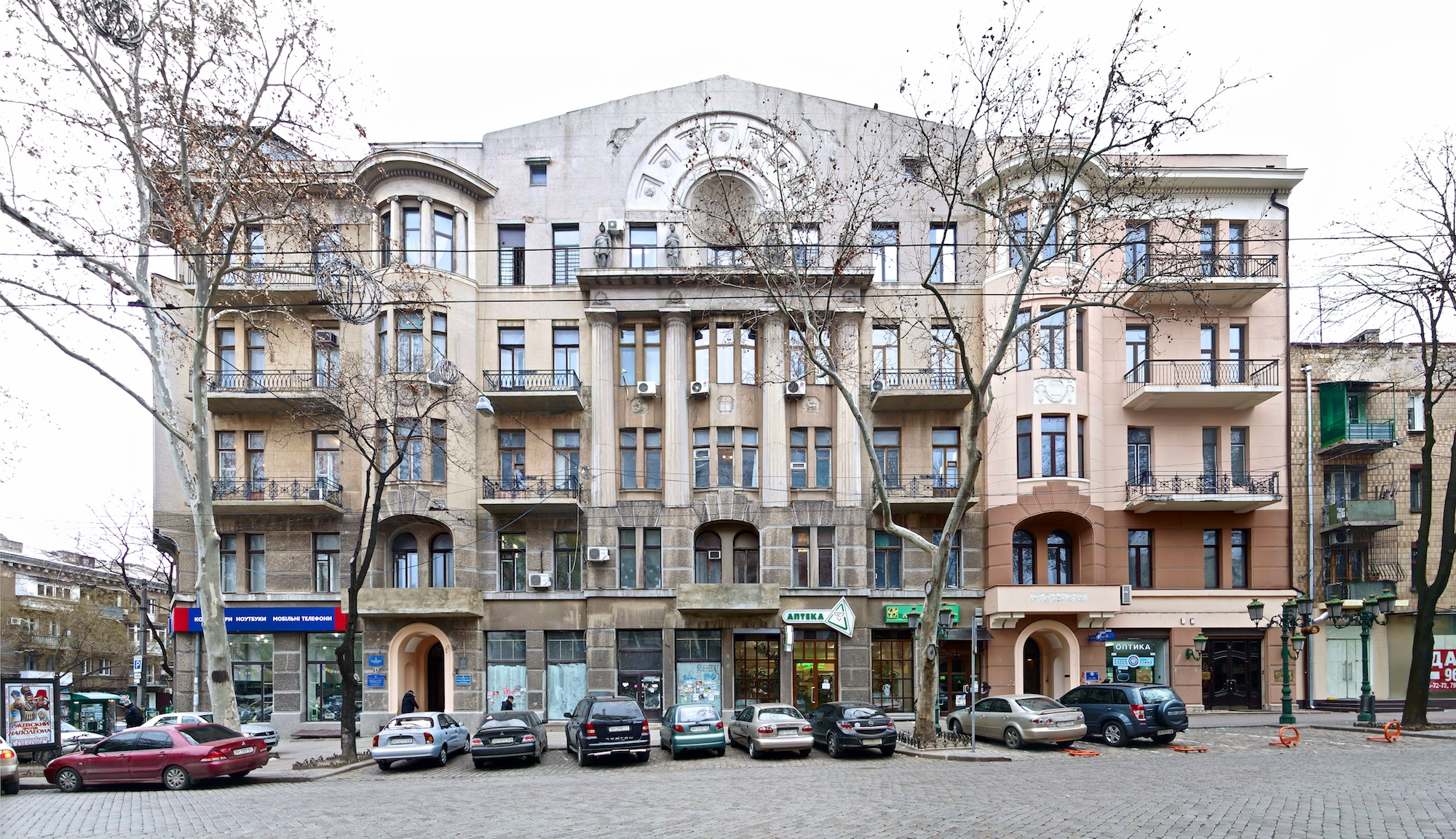
- The building where the institute is located
- Established: 1953
- Head: Halyna Minicheva
- Address: 37, Italiiska St., 65048 Odesa, Ukraine
- Location: Odesa, Ukraine
- Website: https://imb.odessa.ua/

The Institute of Marine Biology is a research institute of the National Academy of Sciences of Ukraine, which located in Odesa, Ukraine. The institute is organized on the base of the Odesa Branch of the Institute of Biology of the Southern Seas.

== History ==
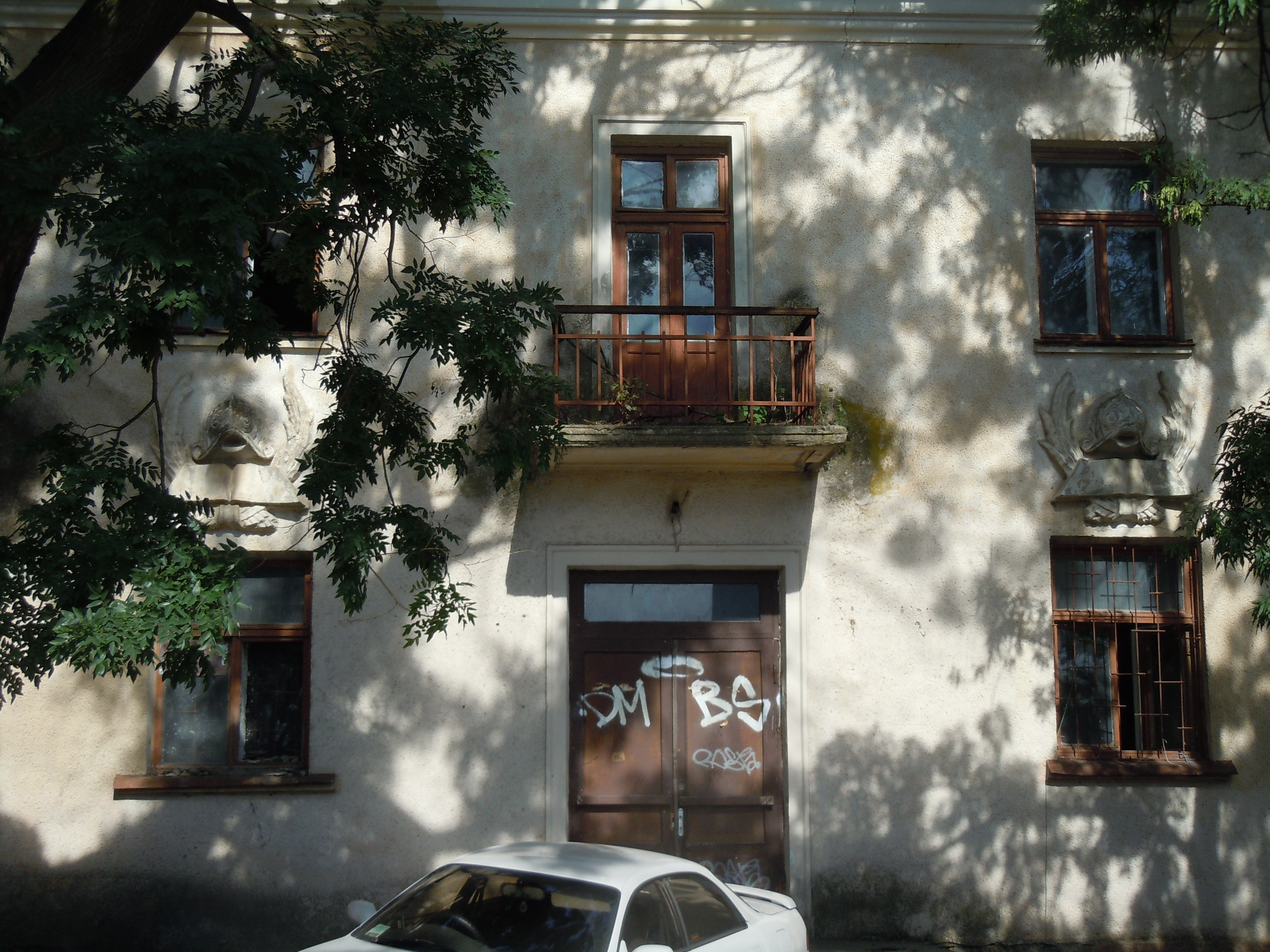
The old building of the Odesa Biological Station in the village of Lustdorf

The institute was established on December 21, 1953, as the Odesa Biological Station of the Institute of hydrobiology of the National Academy of Sciences of Ukraine by the resolution of the Council of Ministers of the Ukrainian SSR. When the Sevastopol Biological Station was reorganised in the Institute of Biology of the Southern Seas in 1963, the Biological Station in Odesa was also reorganised in the Odesa Branch of the Institute of Biology of the Southern Seas by the special resolution No. 796 at June 11, 1963. During the long period (1953-1963), the head of the biological station, and then the head of the branch, was professor Konstantin Vinogradov. Later, from 1972 to 1989 Professor Yuvenali Zaitsev was the head of the branch. During 1989-1994 the branch was ruled by geographer, Professor Oleksandr Bronfman, but Yuvenali Zaitsev started to be the most famous researcher of the institute. In 1994-2019 professor Borys Aleksandrov is the head of the institute.

The Odesa branch of the Institute of Biology of the Southern Seas was reorganized into the Institute of Marine Biology by the resolution #161 of the National Academy of Sciences of Ukraine, dated July 2, 2014. The resolution started to be valued from August 2, 2014.

== The scientific direction ==
The main scientific direction of the institute is the complex study of the different approaches of biology and ecology of marine ecosystems. Among them:

- The ecology of water body subjects to the influence of large port-industrial complexes and communal agglomerations.
- The hydrobiological amelioration and restoration of damaged ecosystems.
- The mathematical modeling of aquatic ecosystems for the purpose of obtaining unbiased diagnosis and prognosis of their state
- The creation of computer bases of ecological data on the north-western Black Sea shelf, coastal areas, lagoons and estuaries of the Danube-Dniester interfluve.

The institute elaborates the modern methods of the sampling and processing of the hydrobiological samples, new methods of the analyzing of the scientific information. The institute provides scientific expertise, improves the methods of protection and management of ecosystems and their sustainable development. The Institute provides training of scientific personnel by the post-graduate and post-doc studies on the hydrobiological and zoological specialisations.

== Sources ==
- Odesa Branch of O. O. Kovalevsky Institute of Biology of the Southern Seas
- REEF: Odesa Branch Institute of Biology of the Southern Seas, National Academy of Sciences of Ukraine (OBIBSS)
