= Boris Aleksandrov =

Boris Aleksandrov or Boris Alexandrov (Russian: Борис Александров) may refer to the following notable people:

- Boris Aleksandrov (composer) (1905–1994), Russian composer
- Boris Aleksandrov (ice hockey) (1955–2002), Soviet and Kazakh ice hockey player
- Borys Aleksandrov (research vessel)
