= Belgica Rupes =

Rupes on Mercury

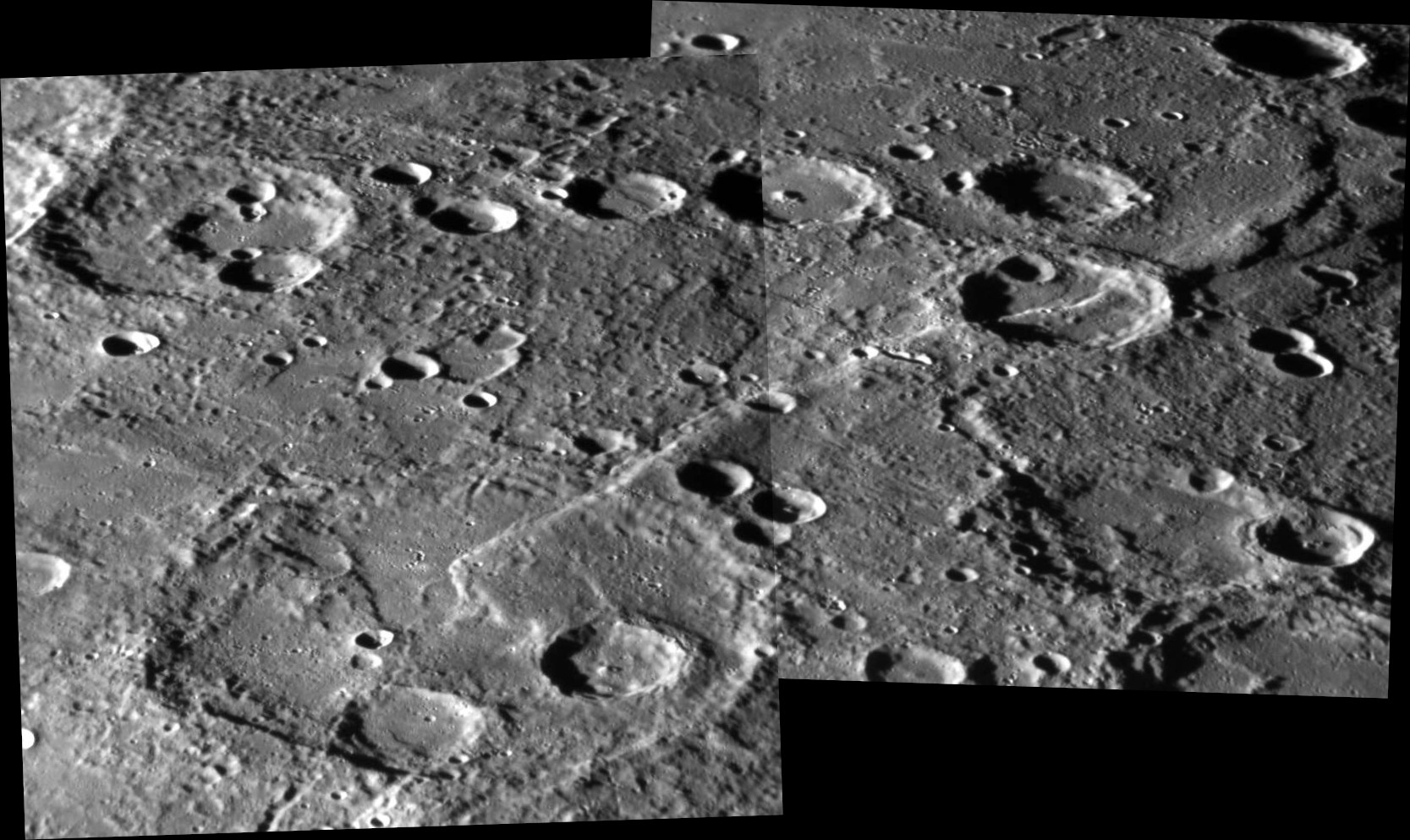
- Oblique MESSENGER NAC mosaic
- Feature type: Rupes
- Coordinates: 50.45°S 296.24°W
- Eponym: RV Belgica (ship)

Belgica Rupes is an escarpment in the Debussy quadrangle of Mercury. The escarpment is approximately 425 km long and cuts across the crater Carleton. It was named after the RV Belgica, a Belgian ship used for an expedition to determine the position of the South Magnetic Pole in 1898, and the first ship to winter in Antarctica. Its name was adopted by the International Astronomical Union (IAU) in 2013.

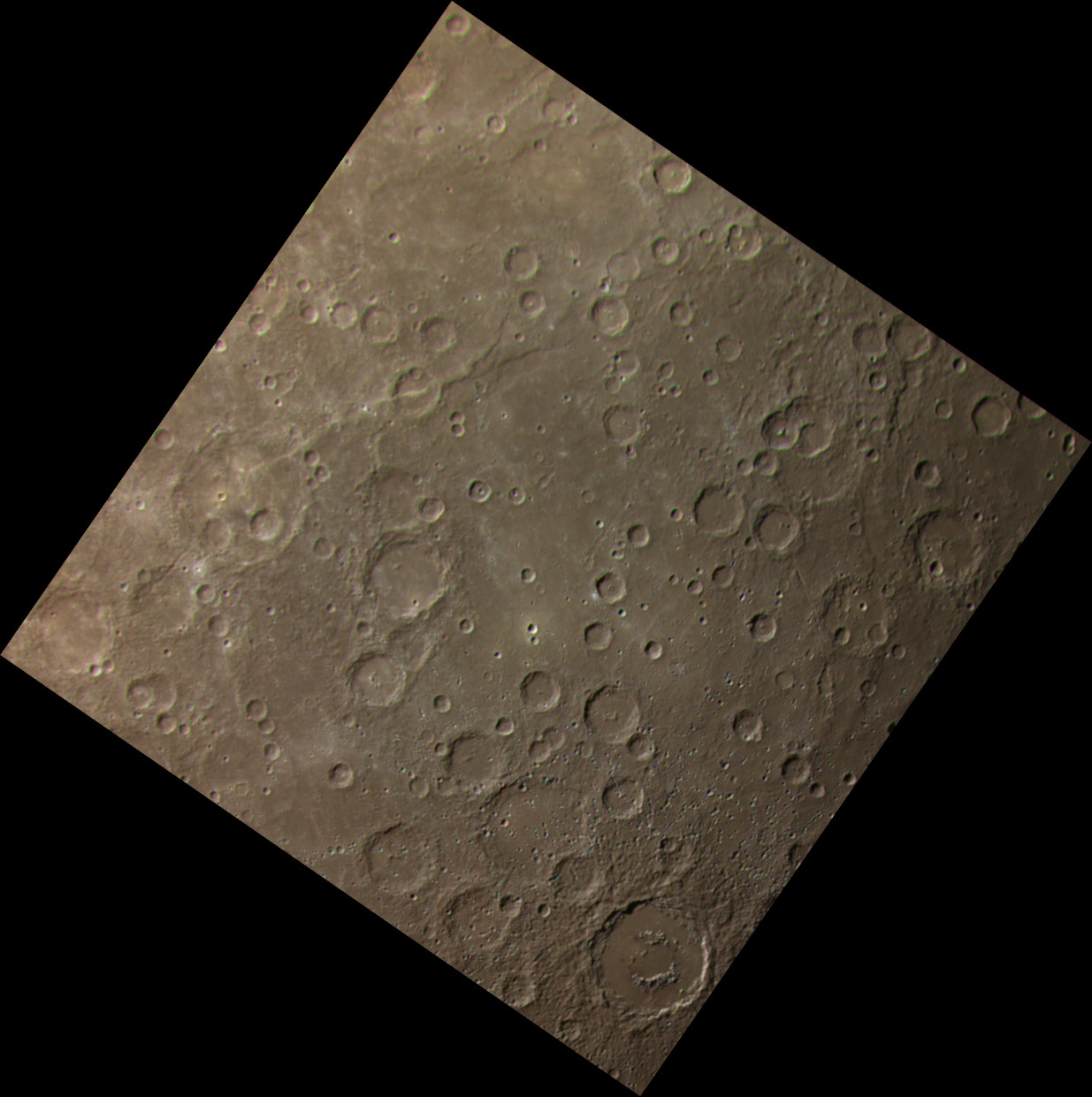
Exaggerated color image with Carleton and Belgica Rupes in upper left

== See also ==
- List of escarpments
