= SS Belgica =

A number of steamships have been named Belgica.

- SS Belgica (1884), a barque-rigged ship used in the Belgian Antarctic Expedition of 1897–1901.
- SS Belgica (1894), built by The Strand Slipway Co, Sunderland. As Fertilia, she was torpedoed and sunk by HMS Thunderbolt on 30 January 1942.
- SS Belgica (1918), built by The Pusey & Jones Co, Wilmington, Delaware. Laid down as War Compass. Scrapped in 1960.
- MV Belgica (1984), a former survey vessel of the Belgian Navy, donated to Ukraine in 2021.

== See also ==
- Belgica (disambiguation)
