= Lancaster Hill =

Hill in Antarctica

Lancaster Hill (65°21′S 64°0′W) is a hill at the south side of the mouth of Trooz Glacier, on the west coast of Graham Land, Antarctica. It was first charted by the French Antarctic Expedition, 1908–10, under Jean-Baptiste Charcot. The hill was named by the UK Antarctic Place-Names Committee in 1959 for Sir James Lancaster, an English navigator of the East India Company who was responsible for the first regular use of fruit juice to prevent scurvy on ships, in 1601.
