= Belgium (disambiguation) =

Belgium is a country in Europe.

Belgium may also refer to:

== History ==
- United States of Belgium, an antecedent to modern Belgium

== Places ==
- Belgium, Illinois, United States
- Belgium, West Virginia, United States
- Belgium, Wisconsin, United States
- Belgium (town), Wisconsin, United States
- Belgium Township, Polk County, Minnesota, United States

== Other uses ==
- "Belgium", a song by Bowling for Soup, appearing on their album Let's Do It for Johnny!
- SS Belgique, one of the names of the ship SS Hoxie
- Belgium, a temporary renaming of the Belgian beer brand Jupiler in support of the Belgium national football team at the 2018 FIFA World Cup
- Belgium, an alternate name for Devon (sausage)

== See also ==
- Belgian (disambiguation)
- Belgaum
