= Trooz Glacier =

Glacier in Graham Land, Antarctica

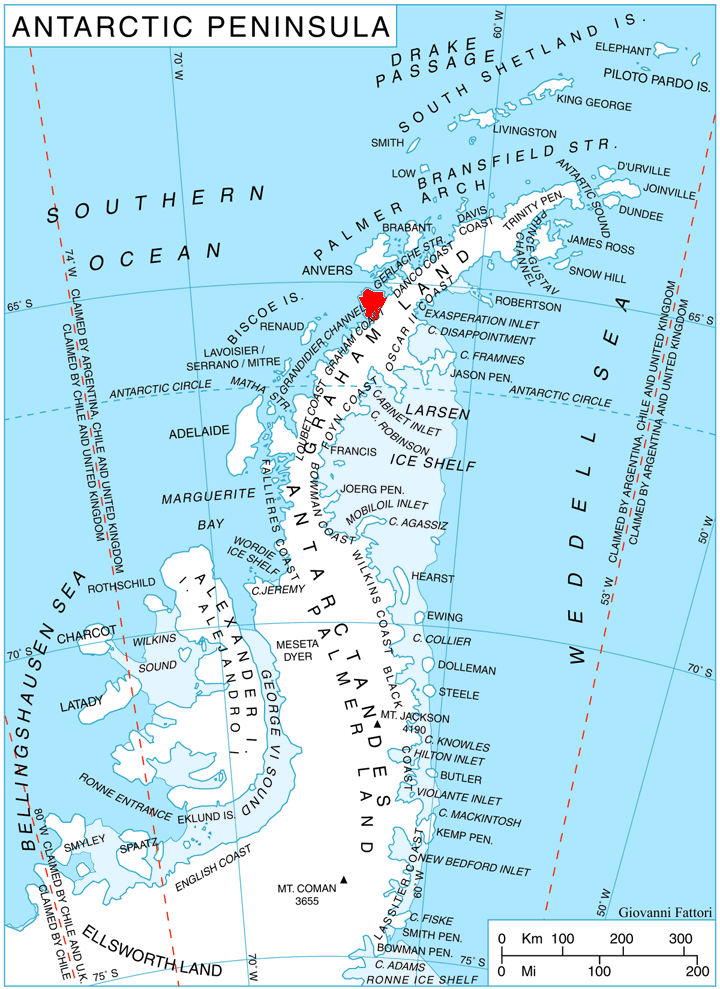
Location of Kyiv Peninsula in Graham Land, Antarctic Peninsula.

Trooz Glacier (65°20′S 63°58′W) is an Antarctic glacier. Situated on the Kyiv Peninsula in Graham Land, 1.5 nautical miles (2.8 km) wide at its mouth and some 15 nautical miles (28 km) long, it flows west into the north part of Collins Bay. It was Discovered by the French Antarctic Expedition, 1908–10 and Named for J. de Trooz, Belgian Minister of the Interior and Public Instruction, who was instrumental in procuring funds for the publication of the scientific results of the Belgian Antarctic Expedition, 1897–99. This application was suggested by the Advisory Committee on Antarctic Names (US-ACAN) because of duplication of the name Trooz for what is now known as Cape Perez.
