= SS Belgic =

Four ships of the White Star Line have been named SS Belgic:

- SS Belgic (1873) was a cargo steamship launched in 1873, chartered to the Occidental and Oriental Steamship Company in 1875, sold and renamed Goefredo in 1883 and wrecked in 1884.
- SS Belgic (1885) was a cargo steamship launched in 1885, sold to Atlantic Transport Line in 1899 and renamed Mohawk. She was scrapped in 1903.
- SS Belgic (1902) was launched as the cargo ship Mississippi in 1902 for Atlantic Transport Line and transferred in 1906 to Red Star Line as SS Samland. In 1911 she was transferred to White Star Line and renamed SS Belgic. In 1913 she returned to Red Star Line as SS Samland. She was scrapped in 1931.
- SS Belgic (1914) was a passenger liner launched in 1914. She was transferred to Red Star Line in 1923 and renamed SS Belgenland. She was transferred to Atlantic Transport Line in 1935 and renamed Columbia. She was scrapped in 1936.
