= Bockstael metro station =

Metro station in Brussels, Belgium

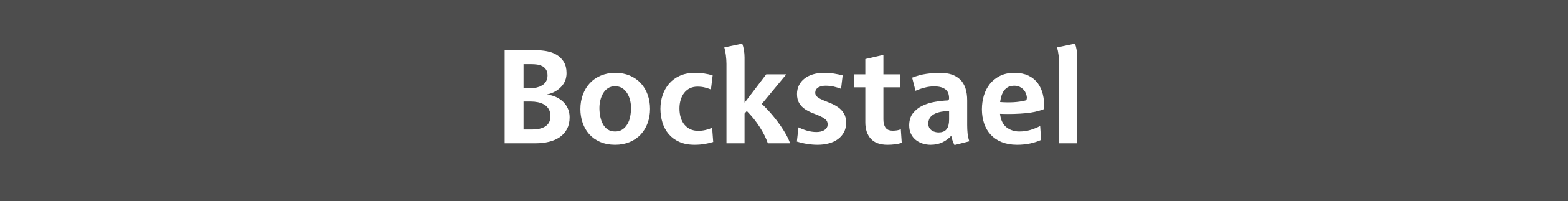

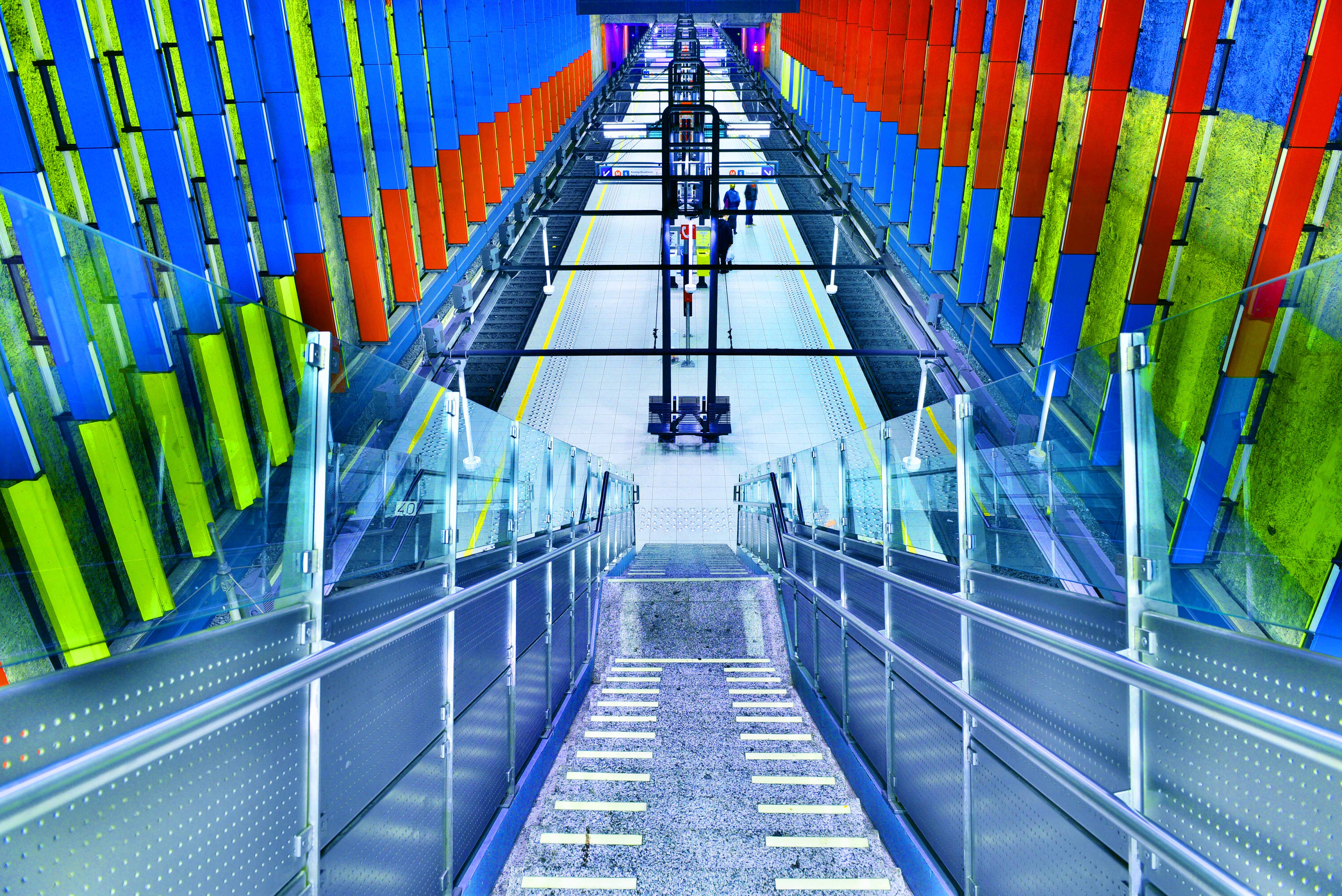
- Bockstael metro station

General information
- Location: Place Émile Bockstael / Émile Bockstaelplein; 1020 Laeken, City of Brussels, Brussels-Capital Region, Belgium
- Coordinates: 50°52′39″N 4°20′51″E
- Owner: STIB/MIVB
- Platforms: 1 island platform
- Tracks: 2

Construction
- Structure type: Underground

History
- Opened: 6 October 1982; 43 years ago

Services
| Preceding station | Brussels Metro | Following station |
|---|---|---|
| Pannenhuis towards Elisabeth | Line 6 | Stuyvenbergh towards King Baudouin |
Location

Bockstael (French pronunciation: [bɔkstal]; Dutch pronunciation: [ˈbɔkstaːl]) is a Brussels Metro station on the northern branch of line 6. It is located in Laeken, in the north-west of the City of Brussels, Belgium. The station received its name from the aboveground square Place Émile Bockstael/Émile Bockstaelplein, itself named after the liberal politician and former mayor of Laeken, Émile Bockstael.

The metro station opened on 6 October 1982 as part of the Beekkant–Bockstael extension of former line 1A. Prior to the opening of an extension to Heysel/Heizel on 5 July 1985, the station was the northern terminus of the metro. On 25 August 1998, the line was further extended to Roi Baudouin/Koning Boudewijn. Then, following the reorganisation of the Brussels Metro on 4 April 2009, it is served by line 6.

The station allows transfer to and from suburban railway line 50 to Aalst and Dendermonde via Belgian Rail. A two track railway station with side platforms is integrated into the subway complex and replaced Laeken's old railway station, located about 200 metres (660 ft) eastwards.

== See also ==
- Transport in Brussels
- History of Brussels
