= Belgian =

Belgian may refer to:

- Something of, or related to, Belgium
- Belgians, people from Belgium or of Belgian descent
- Languages of Belgium, languages spoken in Belgium, such as Dutch, French, and German
- Ancient Belgian language, an extinct language formerly spoken in Gallia Belgica
- Belgian Dutch or Flemish, a variant of Dutch
- Belgian French, a variant of French
- Belgian horse (disambiguation), various breeds of horse
- Belgian waffle, in culinary contexts
- SS Belgian, a cargo ship in service with F Leyland & Co Ltd from 1919 to 1934
- The Belgian, a 1917 American silent film

== See also ==
- Belgica (disambiguation)
- Belgic (disambiguation)
