= Bélgica Carmona Cabrera =

Mexican politician

- Born: 1 January 1987 (age 39); Oaxaca, Mexico
- Occupation: Politician
- Political party: PRD

Bélgica Nabil Carmona Cabrera (born 1 January 1987) is a Mexican politician from the Party of the Democratic Revolution. From 2009 to 2012, she served as Deputy of the LXI Legislature of the Mexican Congress representing Oaxaca.
