= Collins Bay =

Bay in Antarctica

Collins Bay (65°21′S 64°4′W) is a bay lying between Deliverance Point and Cape Perez on the west coast of Graham Land on the Antarctic Peninsula. It was first charted by the Belgian Antarctic Expedition under Gerlache, 1897–99. It was named by the UK Antarctic Place-Names Committee in 1959 for Rear Admiral Kenneth St. B. Collins, Royal Navy, Hydrographer of the Navy for a number of years beginning in 1955.
