= Borys Aleksandrov (research vessel) =

Supply and research ship

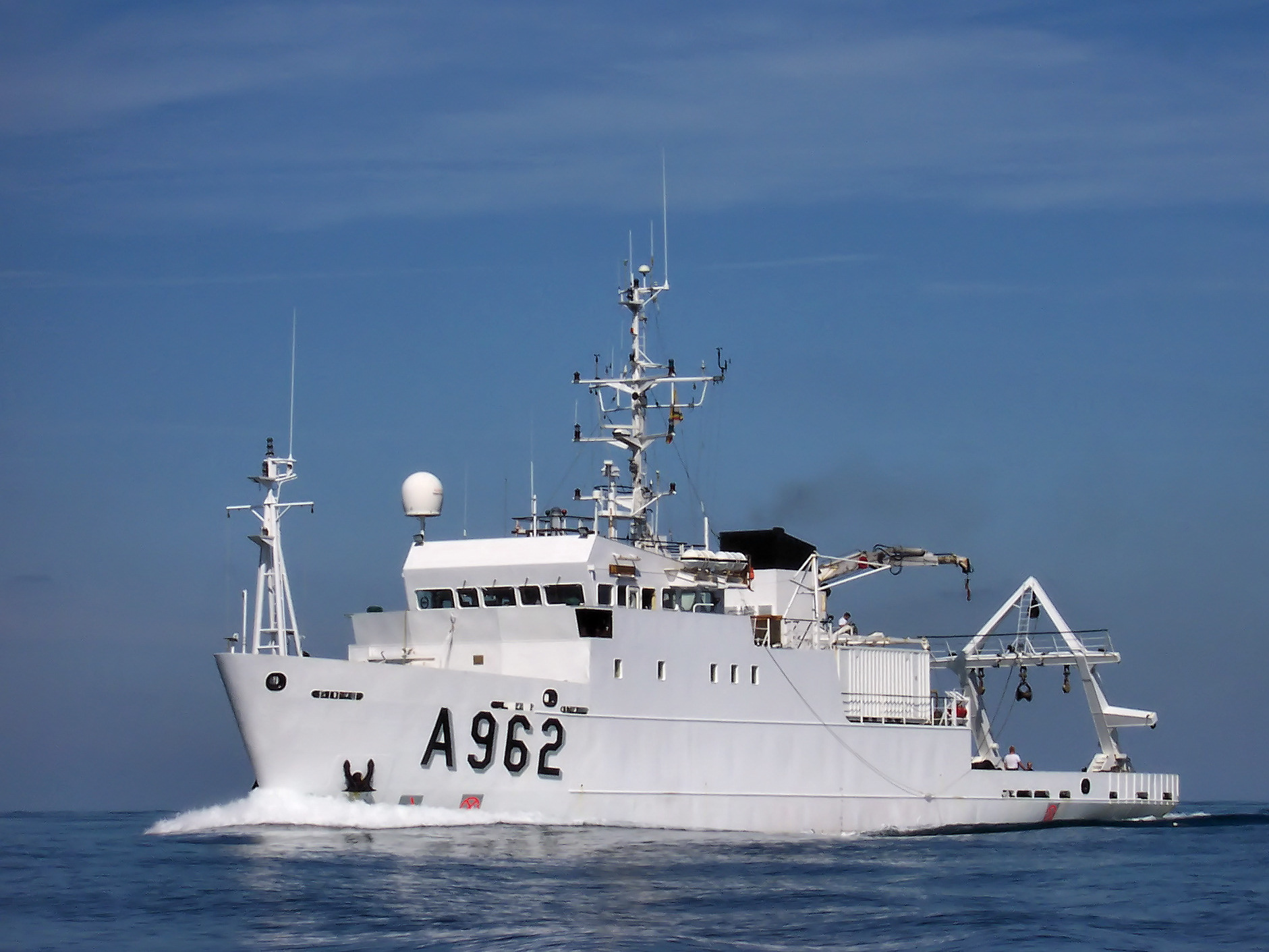
- Belgica, September 2003

Belgium
- Name: Belgica
- Builder: Boelwerf, Temse, Belgium
- Launched: 6 January 1984
- Commissioned: 5 July 1984
- Out of service: October 2021
- Home port: Zeebrugge
- Identification: Pennant number: A962; IMO number: 8222563; MMSI Number 205218000; Callsign ORGQ
- Fate: Transferred to Ukraine

Ukraine
- Name: Borys Aleksandrov
- Namesake: Borys Aleksandrov, head of the Institute of Marine Biology
- Owner: Ukrainian Research Center for Marine Ecology
- Operator: Ukrainian Research Center for Marine Ecology
- Acquired: 2021
- In service: October 2021
- Home port: Odesa, Ukraine
- Identification: IMO number: 8222563
- Status: Out of service

General characteristics
- Class & type: Oceanographic research ship
- Tonnage: 765 GT; 232 NT
- Displacement: 1,200 tons
- Length: 51.12 m (167 ft 9 in)
- Beam: 10.00 m (32 ft 10 in)
- Draught: 4.60 m (15 ft 1 in)
- Depth: 5.70 m (18 ft 8 in)
- Propulsion: Diesel engine
- Speed: 13.5 knots (25.0 km/h; 15.5 mph) maximum
- Range: 20,000 nmi (37,000 km; 23,000 mi) at 12 knots (22 km/h; 14 mph)
- Complement: 30

RV Borys Aleksandrov is a Ukrainian research vessel which was built in 1984. She was previously crewed by the Belgian Navy as RV Belgica and is in active service.

== Description ==
Borys Aleksandrov is 51.12 metres (167 ft 9 in) long, with a beam of 10.00 metres (32 ft 10 in) and a draught of 4.60 metres (15 ft 1 in). Assessed at 765 GT, 232 NT, she has a displacement of 1,200 tons. The ship is propelled by a 1,570 horsepower (1,170 kW) ABC 6M DZC1000-150 diesel engine, driving a kort nozzle ducted propeller. She has a 150 kilowatts (200 hp) bow and stern thruster and an 82 kilowatts (110 hp) electric motor.

Borys Aleksandrov has a range of 20,000 nautical miles (37,000 km; 23,000 mi) at 12 knots (22 km/h; 14 mph). Her maximum speed is 13.5 knots (25.0 km/h; 15.5 mph). She is fitted with a Kongsberg EM 1002 and EM 3002 sonar and an acoustic doppler current profiler. There are five laboratories on board. Power is provided by two diesel powered generators of 275 kilowatts (369 hp) each.

== History ==
Belgica was built by Boelwerf, Temse. She was launched on 6 January 1984 and commissioned on 5 July 1984. Her homeport was Zeebrugge. She was allocated the IMO Number 8222563, MMSI Number 205218000 and pennant number A962. Belgica used the callsign ORGQ. She was named after the RV Belgica, a ship used by Adrien de Gerlache in the Belgian Antarctic Expedition (1897–99).

Belgica was operated by the Management Unit of North Sea Mathematical Models (MUMM) and crewed by the Belgian Naval Component.

In 2013 mechanical problems caused the aging vessel to be taken out of service for four weeks, which prompted the Belgian government to plan her replacement by 2017. This was later postponed to 2020.

Pending her replacement with a new vessel, Belgica was transferred to Ukraine under a joint European Union and United Nations Development Programme project "EU4EMBLAS." Belgium transferred the vessel under a memorandum of understanding between BELSPO, the Royal Belgian Institute of Natural Sciences and the Ukrainian Ministry of Environmental Protection and Natural Resources. The replacement ship in Belgian Navy service was christened by Princess Elisabeth, Duchess of Brabant in June 2022, named Belgica II.

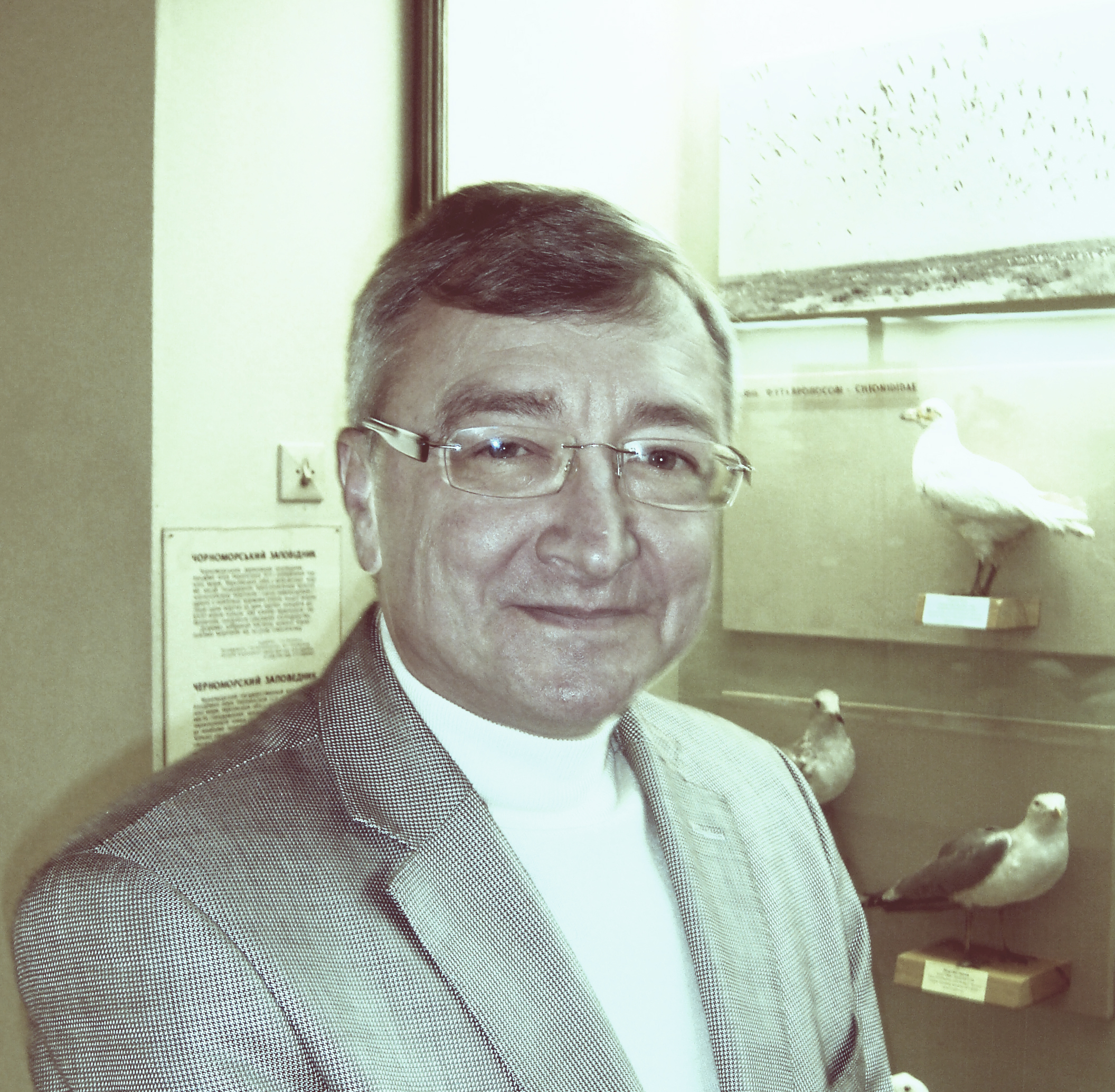
The vessels namesake, Borys Aleksandrov

On 29 October 2021, a renaming ceremony for Belgica took place in Odesa, in the presence of Ukrainian President Volodymyr Zelenskyy, who christened the ship. The vessel was the first dedicated vessel in the countries service for ocean monitoring. The vessel was named after Borys Aleksandrov, an accomplished Ukrainian marine biologist and director of the Institute of Marine Biology who tragically perished in a fire at the institute on 4 December 2019.

On 23 July 2022, Borys Aleksandrov was damaged as a result of a Russian Kalibr missile strike on the Port of Odesa. In October 2022, the head of the National Antarctic Scientific Center of Ukraine Evgeniy Dikiy announced that the organisation planned to restore the vessel. However, a UNESCO report on the Ukrainian science sector published in 2024 describes the research vessel, with an estimated value of $10.4 million USD, as "lost". In March 2026, The Guardian reported that the damaged ship was still at her mooring, listing to one side.
