= SS Hoxie =

History
- Name: Hoxie; Empire Albatross; Belgian Fisherman; Belgique; Martha Hendrik Fisser
- Owner: US Shipping Board (1918-37); US Maritime Commission (1937-40); Ministry of War Transport (1940-42); Belgian Government (1942-46); Compagnie Royale Belgo-Argentine SA (1946-50); Hendrik Fisser AG (1950-58)
- Operator: As owner except:-; Dene Management Co (1940-42); L Dens et Compagnie (1942-46)
- Port of registry: (United States) Baltimore (1918-40); (United Kingdom) London (1940-42); (Belgium) Antwerp (1942-50); (West Germany) Emden (1950-58)
- Builder: Bethlehem Shipbuilding Corporation Ltd, Sparrows Point, Maryland
- Yard number: 4182
- Launched: 7 December 1918
- Completed: March 1919
- Identification: US Official Number 217613 (1918-40); UK Official Number 168090 (1940-42; Code letters LQBF (1918-40); Code letters GNLF (1940-42)
- Fate: Scrapped in Hamburg, 1958

General characteristics
- Tonnage: 4,714 GRT
- Length: 377 ft (114.91 m)
- Beam: 52 ft 3 in (15.93 m)
- Depth: 27 ft (8.23 m)
- Propulsion: 1 x triple expansion steam engine (Bethlehem Shipbuilding Corporation Ltd) 320 hp (240 kW)
- Speed: 11 knots (20 km/h)

Hoxie was a 4,714 ton cargo ship which was built in 1918. She was renamed Empire Albatross in 1940. In 1942, she was renamed Belgian Fisherman. In 1946 she was renamed Belgique and then Martha Hendrik Fisser in 1950. She was scrapped in 1958.

== History ==
=== Pre Second World War ===
Hoxie was built by Bethlehem Steel Corporation, at Sparrows Point, Baltimore, as Emergency Fleet Corporation (EFC) hull number 4182. She was launched on 7 December 1918 and completed in March 1919. She was owned by the United States Shipping Board. Hoxie was chartered by the Baltimore Steam Ship Co in the 1920s. She passed to the United States Maritime Commission in 1937.

=== War service ===
Hoxie passed to the Ministry of War Transport in 1940 and was renamed Empire Albatross, under the management of Sir W Reardon Smith & Sons, Cardiff. Management later passed to Dene Management Co. She was a member of a number of convoys.

HX 145

Convoy HX 145 sailed from Halifax, Nova Scotia on 16 August 1941 and arrived at Liverpool on 31 August.

SC 74

Convoy SC 74 sailed from Halifax on 12 March 1942 and arrived at Liverpool on 28 March. Empire Albatross was carrying a cargo of steel and trucks. Her final destination was Hull.

In 1942, Empire Albatross was sold to the Belgian Government and renamed Belgian Fisherman, under the management of L Dens et Compagnie, Antwerp. On 28 February 1944, Belgian Fisherman was damaged in a collision with the SS Grodno near Safi en route to Gibraltar.

=== Post war ===
In 1946 Belgian Fisherman was sold to the Compagnie Royale Belgo-Argentine SA, Antwerp and renamed Belgique. In 1950, Belgique was sold for scrapping to Van Heyghen Frères, Gent, who resold her to Hendrik Fisser AG, Emden who renamed her Martha Hendrik Fisser. She served with them for eight years. Martha Hendrik Fisser was sold for scrapping to Walter Ritscher who resold her to Eckhardt & Co She was scrapped at Hamburg in the first quarter of 1958.

== Official Number and code letters ==
Official numbers were a forerunner to IMO Numbers.

Hoxie had the American Official Number 217613 and used the code letters LQBF. Empire Albatross had the Official Number 168090 on Lloyds Register and used the code letters GNLF.
