= RV Belgica (1884) =

Research ship built in 1884

Coordinates: 68°47′42″N 16°35′37″E

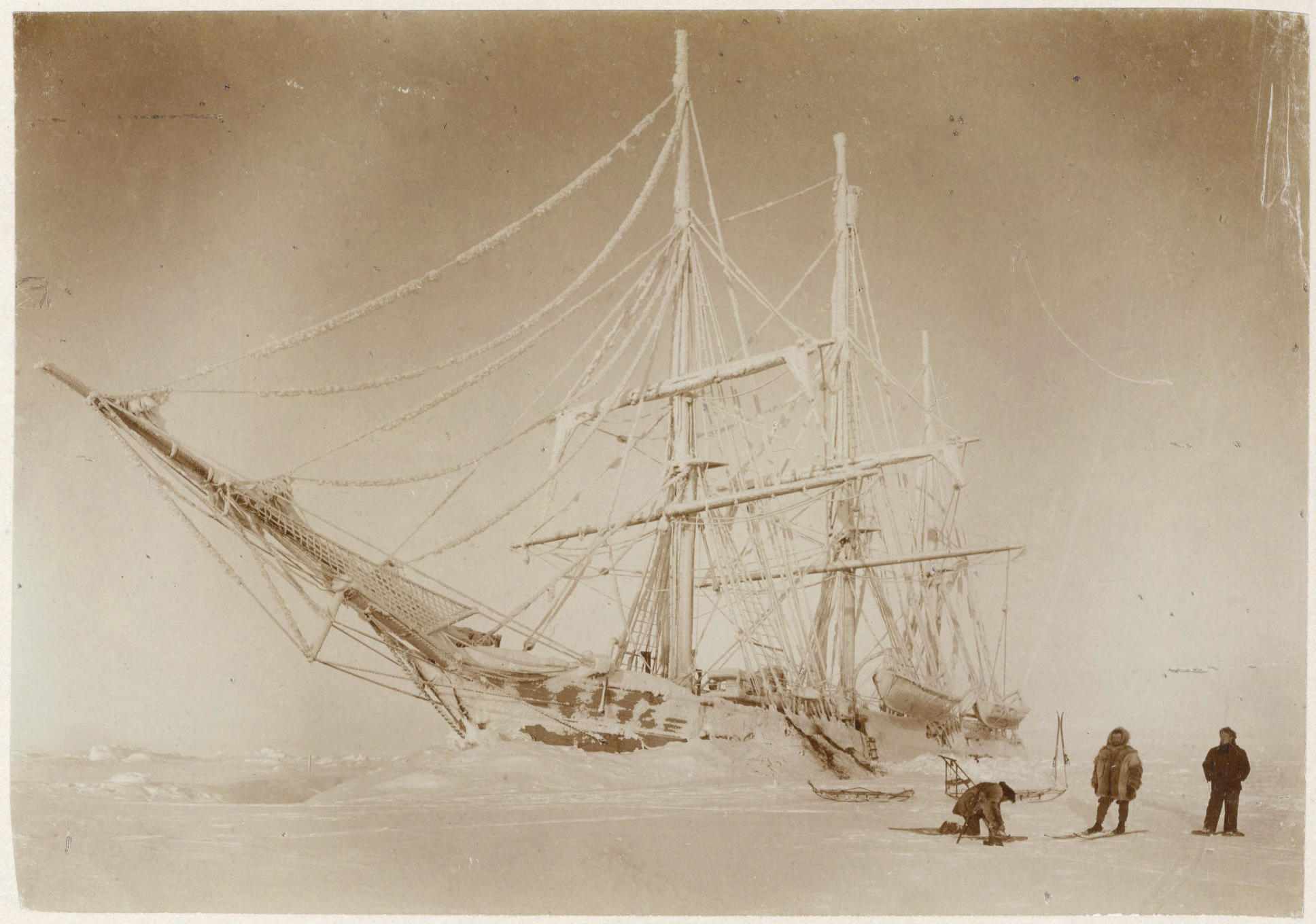
- Belgica trapped in the ice, 1898

History
- Name: Patria (1884–96); Belgica (1896–1916); Isfjord (1916–1917); Belgica (1917–1940)
- Owner: Johan Christian Jakobsen (1884–96); Adrien de Gerlache (1896–1902); N C Halvorsen (1902); Prince Philippe, Duke of Orléans (1902–1916); Det Norske Kulsyndikat (1916–1917); Kristian Holst (1917–1940); Franco-British Expeditionary Force (1940)
- Operator: Johan Christian Jakobsen (1884–1896); Adrien de Gerlache (1896–1897); Belgian Antarctic Expedition (1897–1899); Adrien de Gerlache (1899–1902); N C Halvorsen (1902); Prince Philippe, Duke of Orléans (1902–1916); Det Norske Kulsyndikat (1916–1917); Kristian Holst (1917–1940); Franco-British Expeditionary Force (1940)
- Port of registry: (Norway) Svelvik (1884–1896); (Belgium) Antwerp (1896–1916); (Norway) Spitsbergen (1916–1917); (Norway) Harstad (1917–1940)
- Builder: Christian Brinch Jørgensen
- Launched: 1884
- Out of service: 19 May 1940
- Fate: Scuttled June 1940

General characteristics
- Type: Whaler (1884–1896); Research ship (1896–1901); Whaler (1901–1904); Research ship (1904–1909); Whaler (1909–1918); Factory ship (1918–1940); Depôt ship (1940)
- Tonnage: 263 GRT
- Length: 35.97 m (118 ft 0 in)
- Beam: 7.62 m (25 ft 0 in)
- Draught: 4.11 m (13 ft 6 in)
- Propulsion: Sails, steam engine
- Sail plan: Barque (1884–1918)
- Complement: 23 (Belgian Antarctic Expedition)

Belgica was a barque-rigged steamship that was built in 1884 by Christian Brinch Jørgensen at Svelvik, Norway as the whaler Patria. In 1896, she was purchased by Adrien de Gerlache for conversion to a research ship, taking part in the Belgian Antarctic Expedition of 1897–1901, becoming the first ship to overwinter in the Antarctic. In 1902, she was sold to Philippe, Duke of Orléans and used on expeditions to the Arctic in 1905 and from 1907 to 1909.

In 1916, she was sold and converted to a passenger and cargo ship, serving Spitsbergen from the Norwegian mainland under the name Isfjord. In 1918, she was sold and renamed Belgica, being converted to a factory ship. Requisitioned by the British in April 1940, she was used as a depôt ship, being scuttled when the Franco-British Expeditionary Force evacuated Harstad in northern Norway. In 2007, plans to build a modern replica of Belgica were announced.

== Description ==
The ship was 35.97 metres (118 ft 0 in) long, with a beam of 7.62 metres (25 ft 0 in) and a draught of 4.11 metres (13 ft 6 in). She was rigged as a barque. As well as sails, the ship was propelled by a 35-horsepower (26 kW) steam engine built by Nylands Verksted, Oslo. The engine drove a screw propeller that was arranged so that it could be raised out of the water if necessary.

== History ==
=== Early history ===
Patria was built by Christian Brinch Jørgensen at Svelvik, Norway, as a whaler. The ship was constructed of pine, American pine and oak ribs, with 110 millimetres (4.3 in) thick greenheart planks clad in oak and sheeted in iron. The ship had a strengthened bow to enable her to operate in ice. Her designer and owner was Johan Christian Jakobsen.

=== Antarctic expedition ===
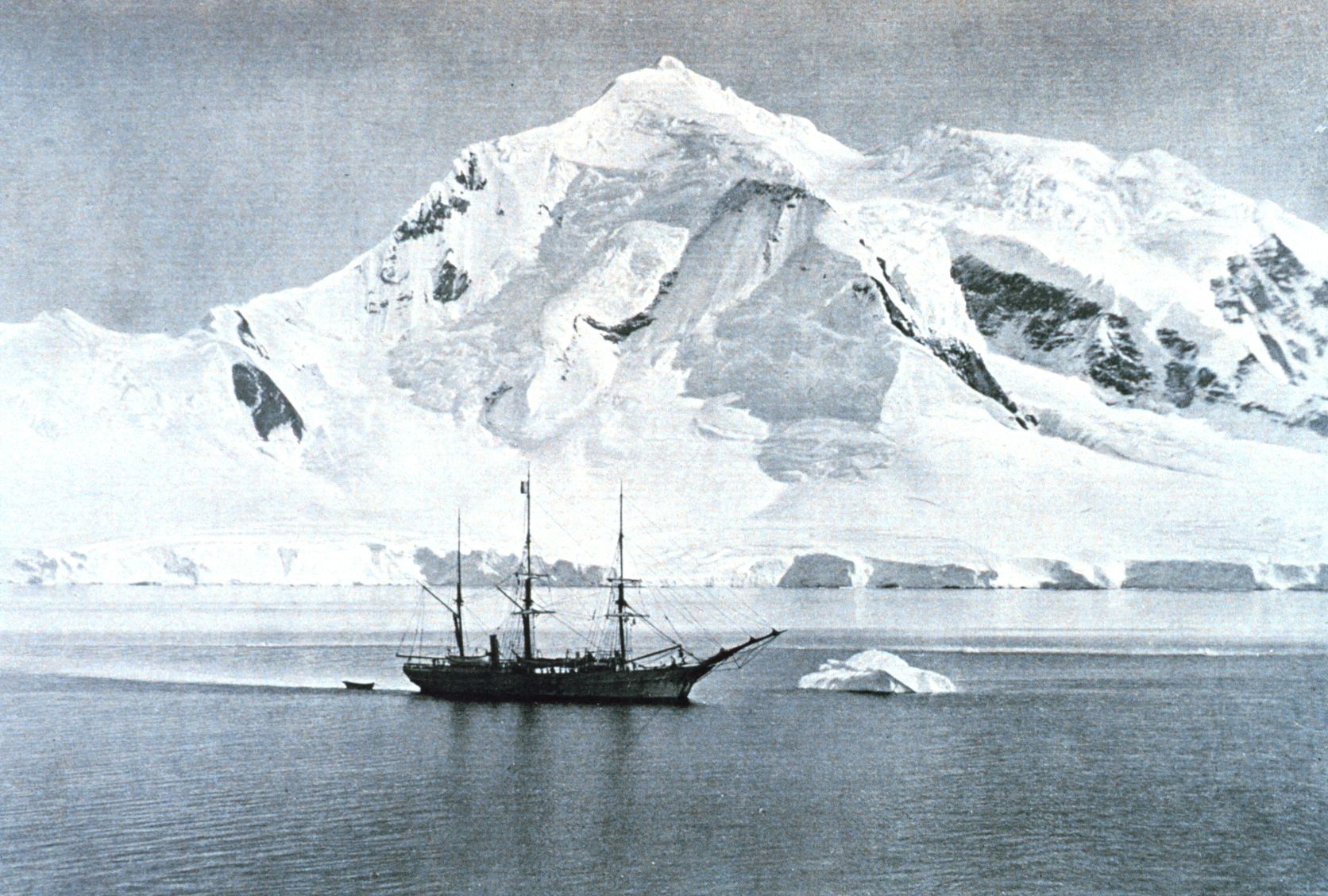
Belgica in Antarctic waters

In 1896, Patria was bought by Adrien de Gerlache for conversion to a research ship. On 4 July 1896, she was renamed Belgica. A 21-gun salute was fired during the renaming ceremony. De Gerlache raised funds for the expedition from the Société Royale Belge de Géographie. Loaded with 40 tons of food in 10,000 tins, on 16 August 1897, Belgica departed Antwerp, Belgium for the Antarctic, with a crew of 23. Led by de Gerlache, the expedition included Georges Lecointe as captain of Belgica. Other members of the expedition included Roald Amundsen, Henryk Arctowski, Antoni Dobrowolski and Emil Racoviță. The overloaded Belgica broke down in the North Sea and was forced to put into Ostend for repairs. Two crewmen deserted there and two more crewmen went ashore without permission, returning to Belgica drunk.

Historical burgee of the Royal Yacht Club of Belgium in Antwerp, which was used as a masthead pennant by the Belgica during the Belgian Antarctic Expedition

At one point, Belgica almost rammed the Belgian royal yacht. Rio de Janeiro, Brazil was reached on 6 October 1897. Frederick Cook joined the ship there. On reaching Montevideo, Uruguay, the cook was fired and a Swedish replacement was hired. On the voyage between Montevideo and Punta Arenas, Chile, the engineer allowed the boiler to run dry. He was dismissed when the ship reached Punta Arenas, which was on 1 December 1897. Further disciplinary problems at Punta Arenas resulted in the Chilean Navy being asked to intervene. The Swedish cook and three Belgian sailors were dismissed, and Belgica departed for the Antarctic somewhat undermanned.

Sailor Carl Wiencke was lost overboard en route to Antarctica, Wiencke Island being named in his honour. Belgica crossed the Antarctic Circle on 15 February 1898. On 3 March, Belgica became wedged in the pack ice. The crew had not prepared for overwintering in Antarctica well. De Gerlache forbade the crew to eat the penguin and seal meat that had been stockpiled because he hated eating it. As a result, scurvy became a problem on board Belgica. Following the death of magnetician Emile Danco on 5 June 1898, the situation worsened. Morale worsened after the death of Nansen, the ship's cat, on 22 June.

By 22 July, command of the ship was taken by Amundsen and Cook, as de Gerlache and Lecointe were too ill. Cook insisted that the men ate the penguin and seal meat, following which the crew rapidly recovered from the scurvy. The prospect of a second winter in Antarctica spurred the crew on in their efforts to free Belgica. On 14 February 1899, Belgica was finally freed from the ice, although it was another month before she was able to set sail for Punta Arenas, where she arrived on 28 March. Belgica was repaired in Punta Arenas, then sailed for Buenos Aires, Argentina. Leaving Buenos Aires on 14 August 1899, she sailed for home, arriving at Boulogne-sur-Mer on 30 October and Antwerp on 5 November, sparking national celebrations in Belgium. Following her return to Belgium in 1901, Belgica was again used for whaling.

=== Arctic expeditions ===
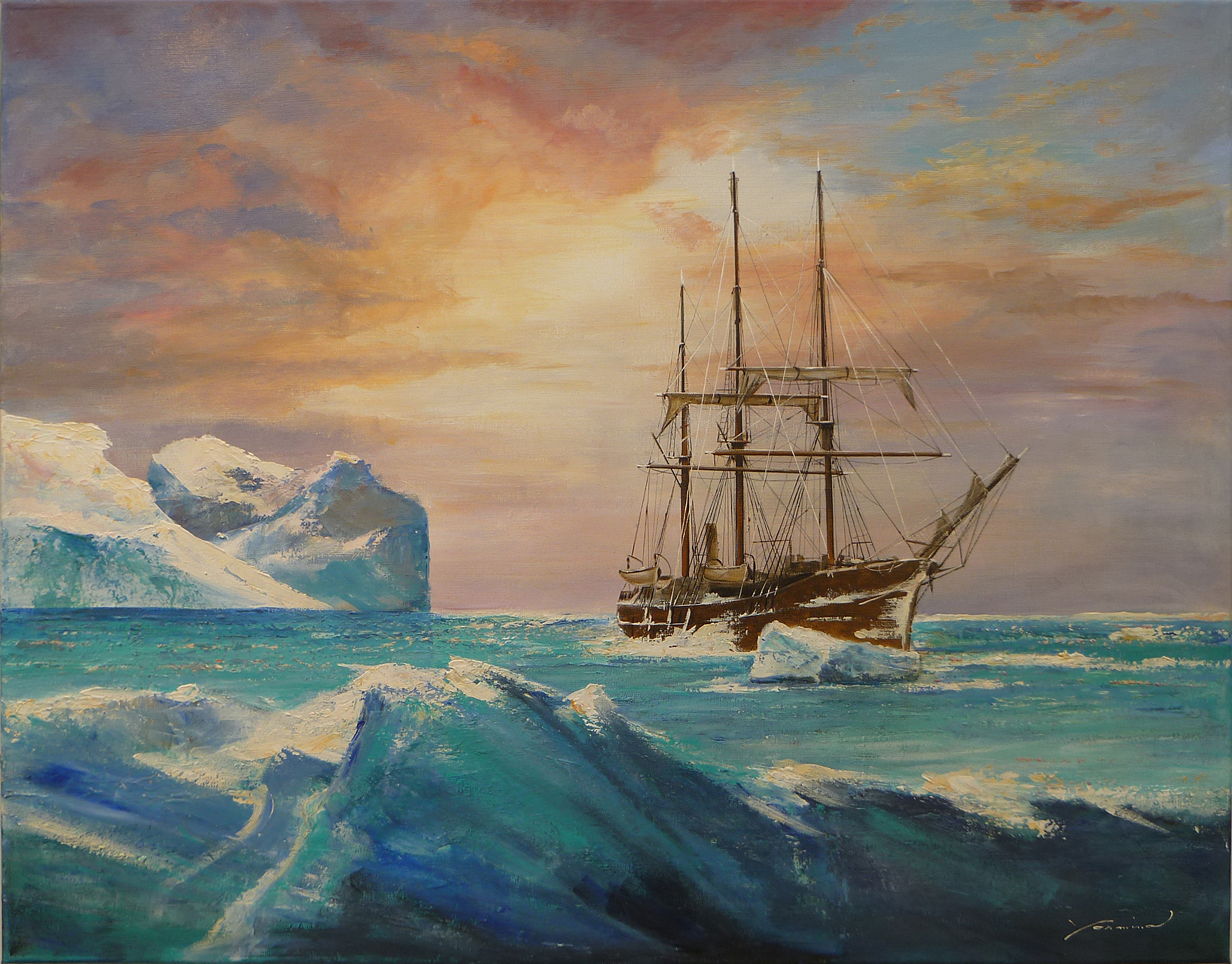
Belgica, painting (2012) by the Belgian painter Yasmina

in 1901, Belgica was chartered as a supply vessel for the Baldwin-Ziegler Polar Expedition. Captain Johan Bryde was to lay supply caches in northeastern Greenland, where the expedition hoped to return from the pole. On Shannon Island and Bass Rock, Bryde erected prefabricated houses made by Swedish company F O Peterson and stocked them with coal, tins of food, kayaks, balloons and a hydrogen generator.

In 1902, Belgica was sold to N C Halvorsen, and then later that year to Philippe, Duke of Orléans. In 1905, she was used in an expedition to chart the north east coast of Greenland, Svalbard and Franz Josef Land, de Gerlache again being involved. In 1907–09, Belgica was used in an expedition to the Arctic, again headed by Philippe and captained by de Gerlache. It was planned to map Arctic Russia, but these plans were abandoned when Belgica again became trapped in ice.

=== Later history ===
In 1916, Belgica was sold to the Store Norske Spitsbergen Kulkompagni, Spitsbergen and was renamed Isfjord. She was rebuilt to include cabins for female staff. Isfjord was used to carry coal and passengers between Svalbard and northern Norway.

In 1918, Isfjord was sold to Kristian Holst, Harstad. She was stripped of her bowsprit, dismasted and converted to a factory ship, regaining her former name Belgica. From the late 1930s, Belgica was used as a coal hulk. In April 1940, Belgica was requisitioned by the Franco-British Expeditionary Force for use as a depôt ship storing high explosives. Belgica was scuttled when the Franco-British Expeditionary Force evacuated from Harstad. The Allied evacuation of Harstad took place on 7 and 8 June 1940, and several British ships were also scuttled in order to avoid having them fall into German hands. The wreck of Belgica was discovered on Easter, 1990. Belgica's anchor is an exhibit in the Polar Museum, Tromsø, Norway. The Sør-Troms Museum in Harstad plans to hold an exhibition of artefacts retrieved from Belgica.

== Replica ==
In 2006, the VZW New Belgica was formed with the intention of constructing a replica of Belgica. The project was officially launched on 9 September 2007 at De Steenschuit's yard in Boom, Antwerp by Kris Peeters, Minister-President of the Belgian region of Flanders. Queen Paola was the project's patron. Construction was scheduled for completion in 2013.

It is planned to raise the wreck of Belgica and to put it on display at the Belgian National Maritime Museum, Antwerp. Before the wreck is raised, the Royal Norwegian Navy will remove the remaining ammunition.

== Tributes ==
A 425 km-long (264 mi) scarp on Mercury has been named Belgica Rupes by the International Astronomical Union based on a suggestion by the MESSENGER team.

== See also ==
- List of Antarctic exploration ships from the Heroic Age, 1897–1922
