= Ibsen (crater) =

Crater on Mercury

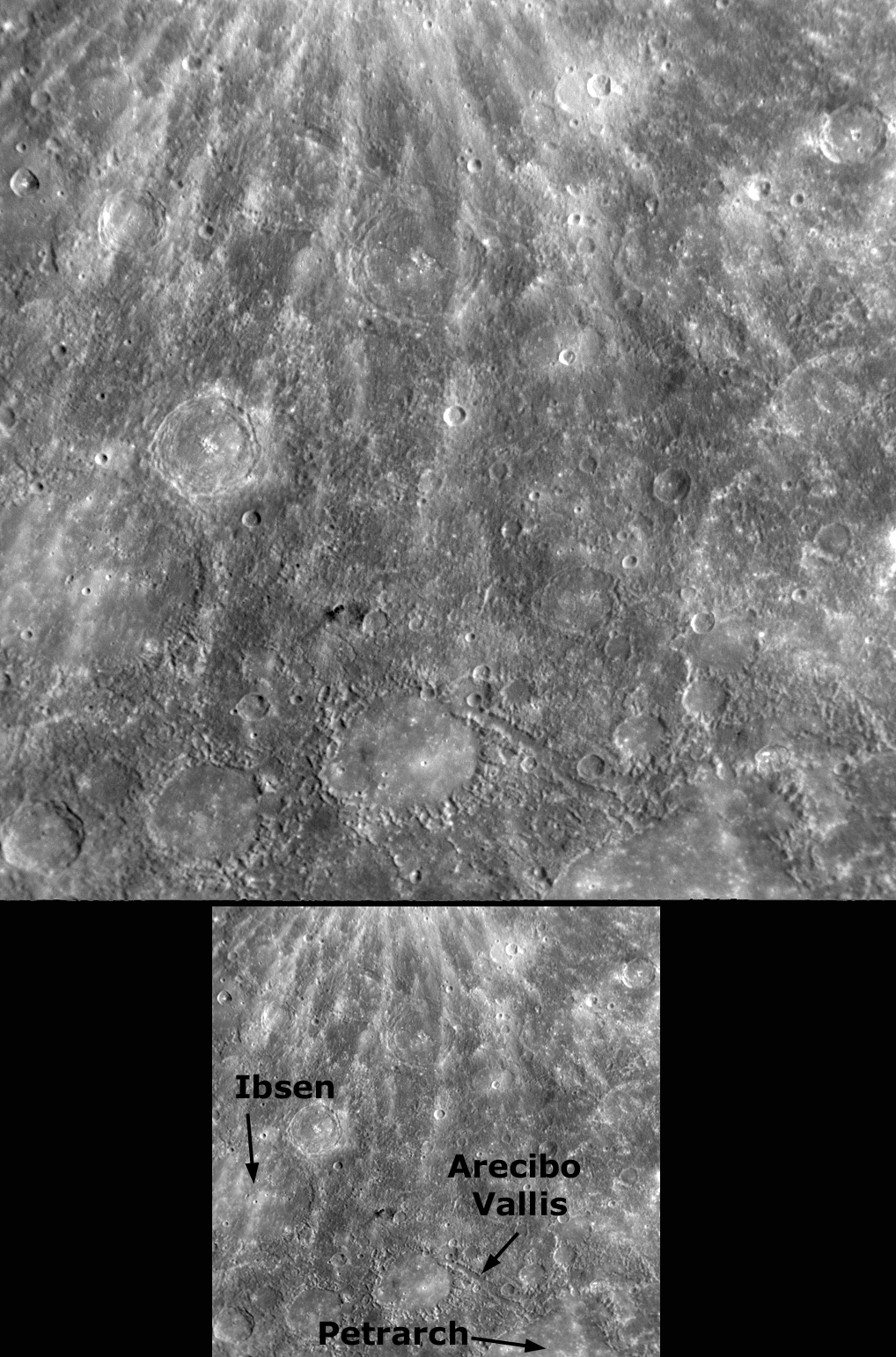
- Feature type: Impact crater
- Location: Discovery quadrangle, Mercury
- Coordinates: 24.35°S 35.89°W
- Diameter: 159 km (99 mi)
- Eponym: Henrik Ibsen

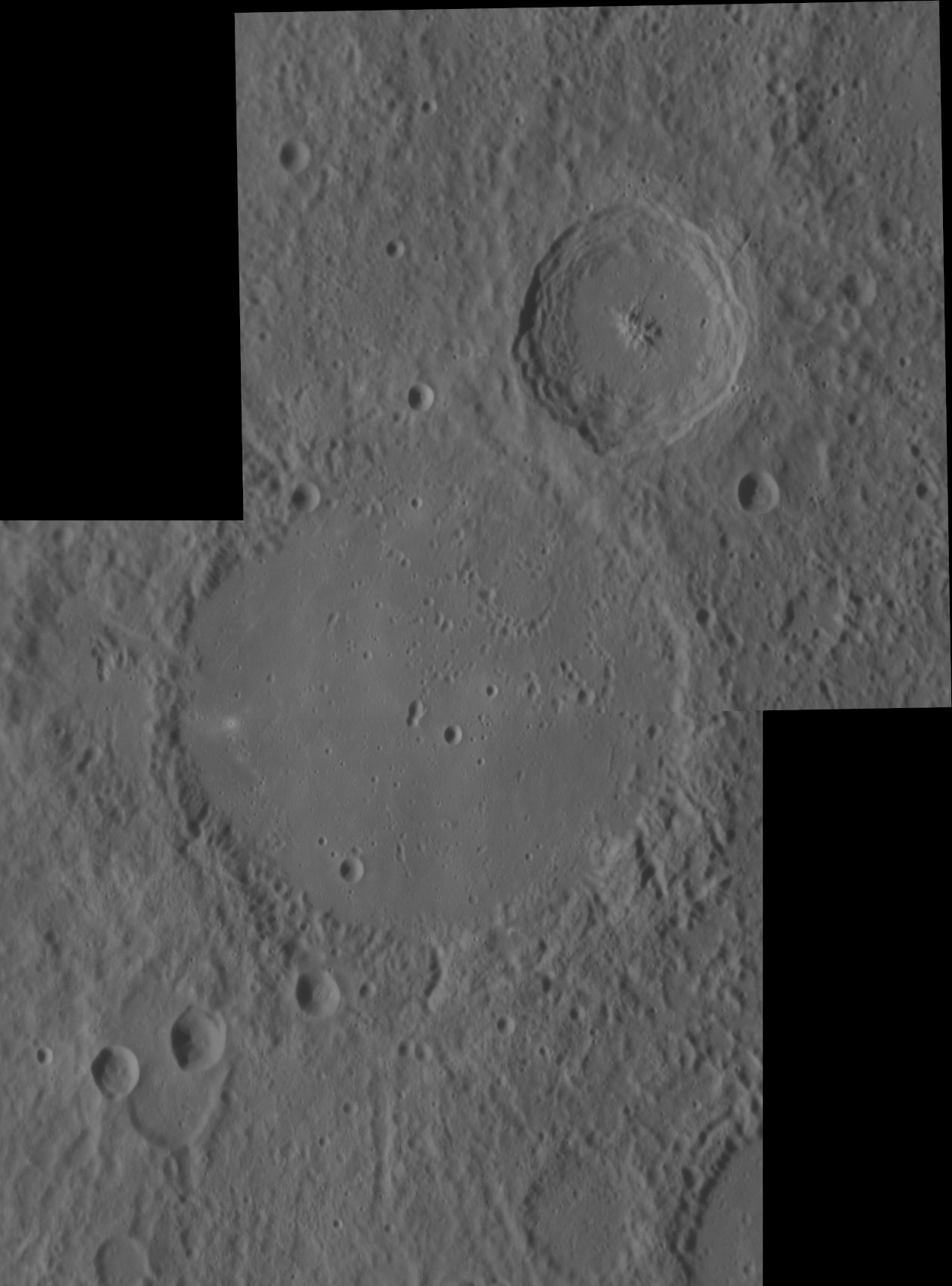
MESSENGER NAC mosaic. Ibsen is at center, and the crater to the northeast is unnamed.

Ibsen is a crater on Mercury. It is located near the antipode of the Caloris Basin. The name was approved by the IAU in 1976. It is named after Norwegian playwright Henrik Ibsen. The crater was first imaged by Mariner 10 in 1974.

Arecibo Catena and the crater Petrarch are to the southeast of Ibsen. Simonides is to the southwest.
