= Arecibo (disambiguation) =

Arecibo may refer to:

== Places ==
- Arecibo, Puerto Rico, USA; a municipality located by the Atlantic Ocean
- Arecibo barrio-pueblo, Arecibo, USA; a borough and county seat of Arecibo municipality
- Senatorial District of Arecibo, in the state senate of Puerto Rico
- Roman Catholic Diocese of Arecibo, in Puerto Rico
- Río Grande de Arecibo (Spanish: Arecibo River), Puerto Rico; a river
- 4337 Arecibo, an Outer Main-belt Asteroid discovered in 1985
- Arecibo Vallis, a valley on Mercury

== Facilities and structures ==
- Arecibo Observatory, an astronomical radio observatory located approximately south-southwest from the city of Arecibo
  - Arecibo Telescope, a very sensitive radio telescope located at the observatory
    - Arecibo Planetary Radar, a radar astronomy station located at the radio telescope Arecibo Telescope
- University of Puerto Rico at Arecibo (UPR-Arecibo), Arecibo, Puerto Rico, USA
- Arecibo Light (Spanish: Faro de Arecibo), Arecibo, Puerto Rico; a lighthouse

== Other uses ==
- Arecibo message, a message beamed into space via frequency modulated radio waves in 1974
- Arecibo (EP), an extended play by English singer Little Boots
- Arecibo Captains, a team in National Superior Basketball, the Puerto Rican basketball league

== See also ==
- Arasibo (15th century), a Taino Amerind chief
- GALEX Arecibo SDSS Survey, an astronomical survey
