= Blue Ring Nebula =

Nebula in the constellation Hercules

Nebula
- Composite image of the Blue Ring Nebula.

Observation data: J2000 epoch
- Right ascension: 16h 48m 37.41s
- Declination: +35° 12' 09.44"
- Distance: 6,300 ly
- Constellation: Hercules

The Blue Ring Nebula is a cosmic object located approximately 6,300 light years away in the constellation Hercules. It was formed when two stars merged, creating a debris cloud that eventually cooled down and produced hydrogen molecules that collided with the interstellar medium. The collisions made the molecules radiate far-ultraviolet light, allowing GALEX to discover the object in 2004. The merging of the two stars resulted into a new star designated as TYC 2597-735-1.
