= Equiano =

Equiano may refer to:

- Equiano (crater), a crater on Mercury named after Olaudah Equiano
- Equiano (horse), a French-bred Thoroughbred racehorse and sire
- Equiano or HD 43197 b, an exoplanet in Canis Major
- Equiano (submarine communications cable), a submarine communications cable owned by Google that runs from Portugal to South Africa, named after Olaudah Equiano

== People with the surname ==
- Olaudah Equiano (c. 1745–1797), Nigerian writer and abolitionist
