= Rainey (crater) =

Crater on Mercury

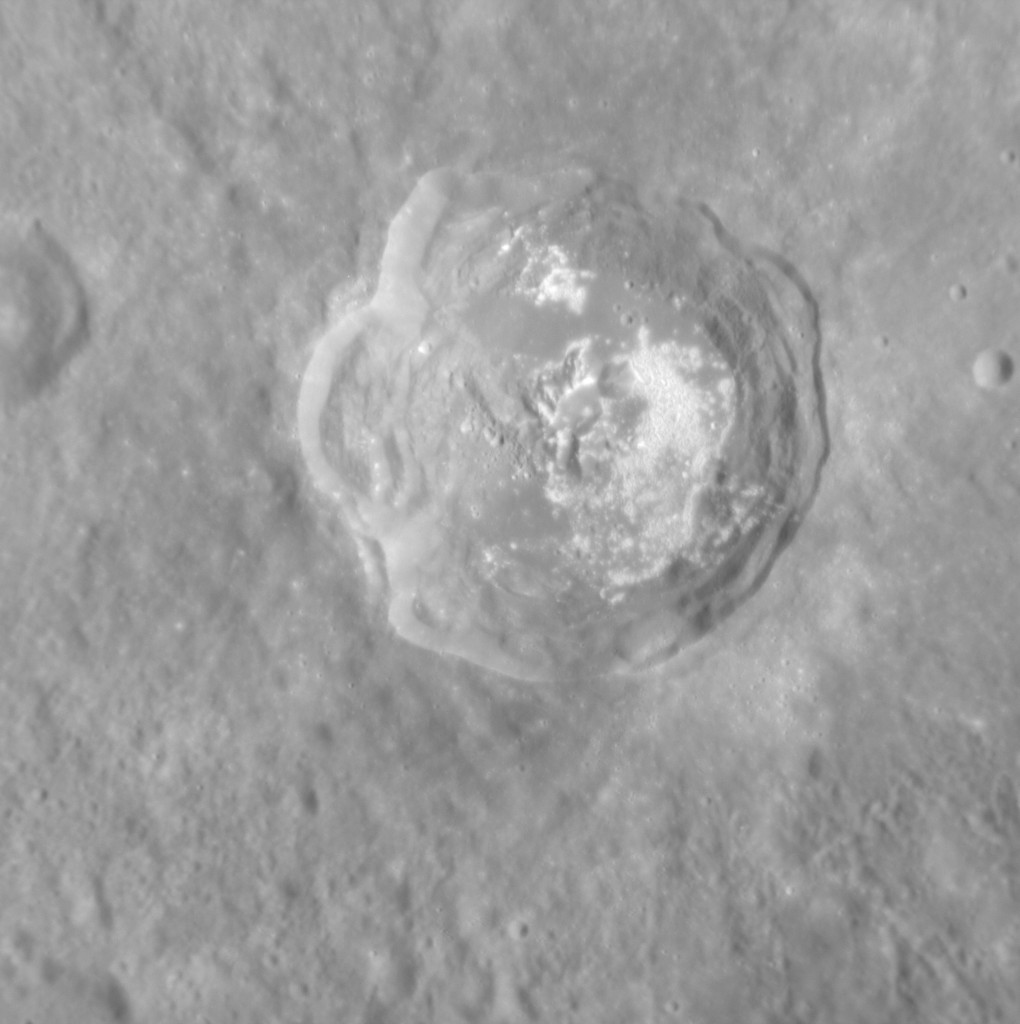
- MESSENGER NAC
- Planet: Mercury
- Coordinates: 33.55°S 39.56°W
- Quadrangle: Discovery
- Diameter: 40.0 km (24.9 mi)
- Eponym: Ma Rainey

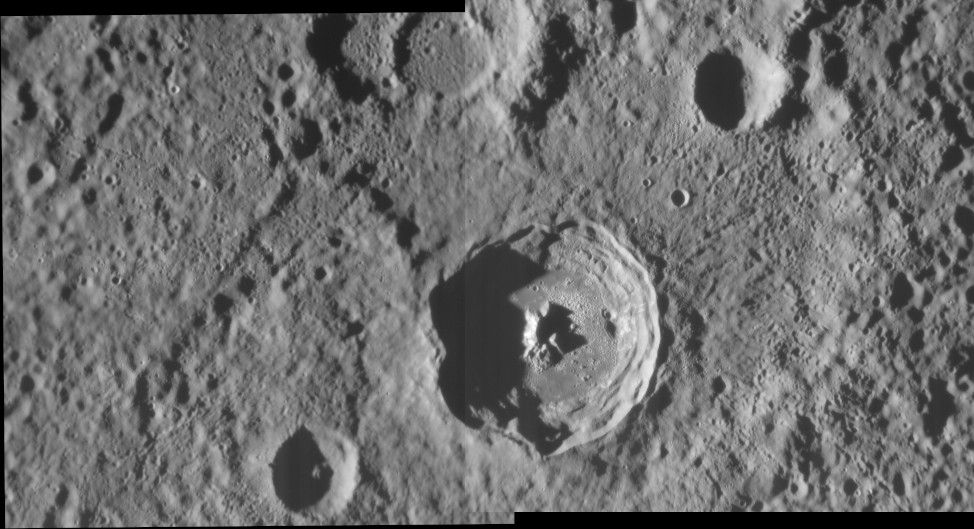
Rainey crater

Rainey is a crater on Mercury. Its name was adopted by the International Astronomical Union (IAU) on February 7, 2025. The crater is named for American blues singer and early-blues recording artist Gertrude "Ma" Rainey. The crater was first imaged by Mariner 10 in 1974.

Rainey has extensive patches of hollows on its floor.

To the northwest of Rainey is Simonides. Neumann is to the southeast.
