= Mofolo (crater) =

Crater on Mercury

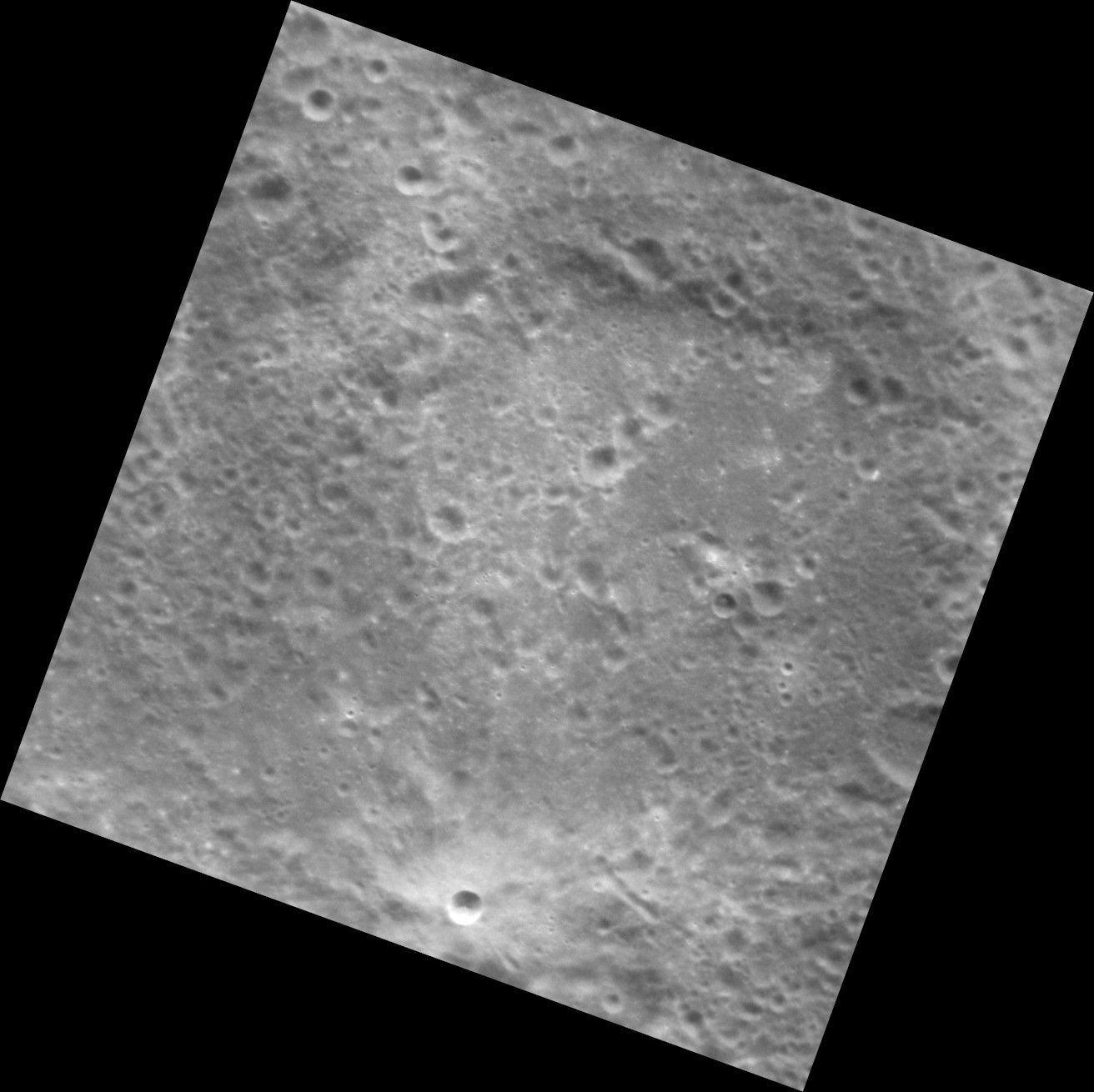
- MESSENGER NAC image of Mofolo
- Feature type: Impact crater
- Location: Discovery quadrangle, Mercury
- Coordinates: 37.68°S 28.22°W
- Diameter: 103.0 km (64.0 mi)
- Eponym: Thomas Mofolo

Mofolo is a crater on Mercury. Its name was adopted by the International Astronomical Union in 1976. Mofolo is named for the Basotho writer Thomas Mofolo, who lived from 1876 or 1877 to 1948. The crater was first imaged by Mariner 10 in 1974.

To the north of Mofolo is Petrarch crater and the "weird terrain" that is antipodal to the Caloris basin. To the west is Neumann crater, and to the southwest is Equiano.

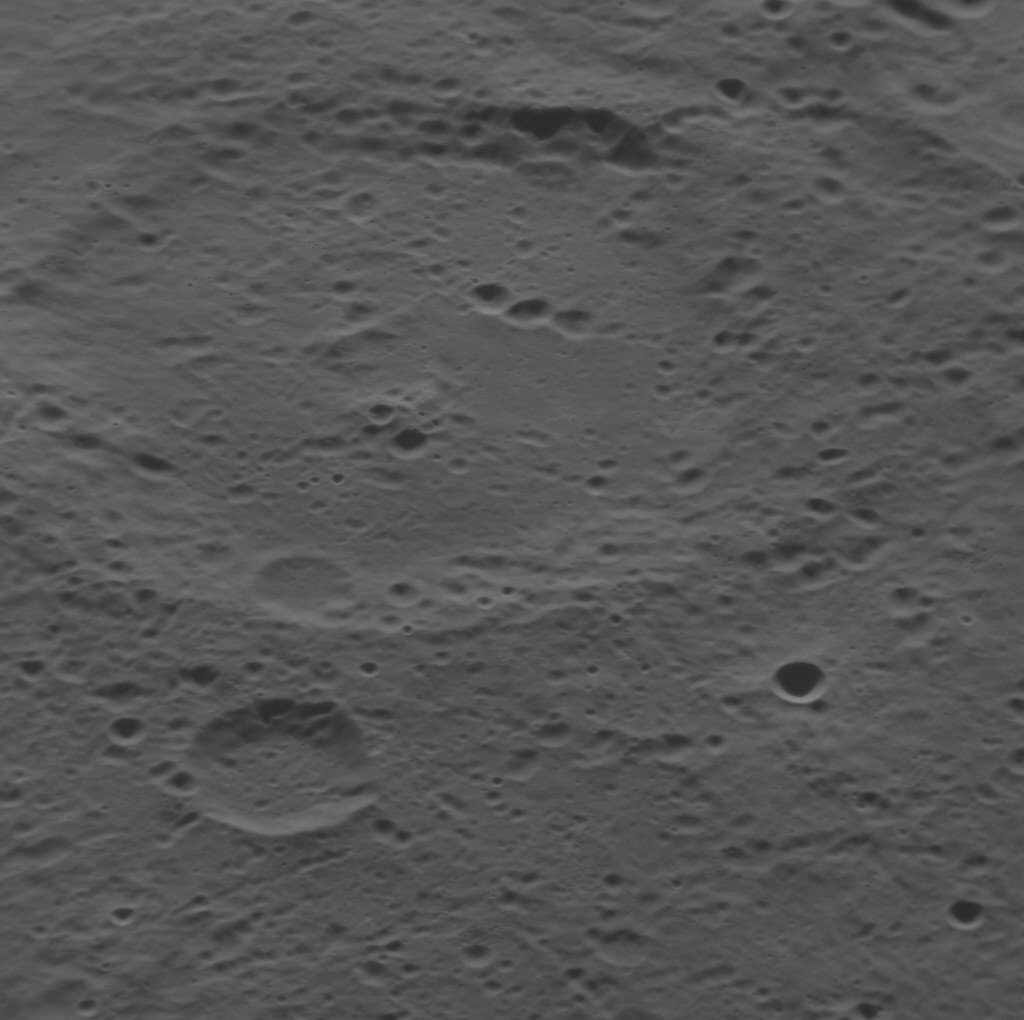
Oblique view

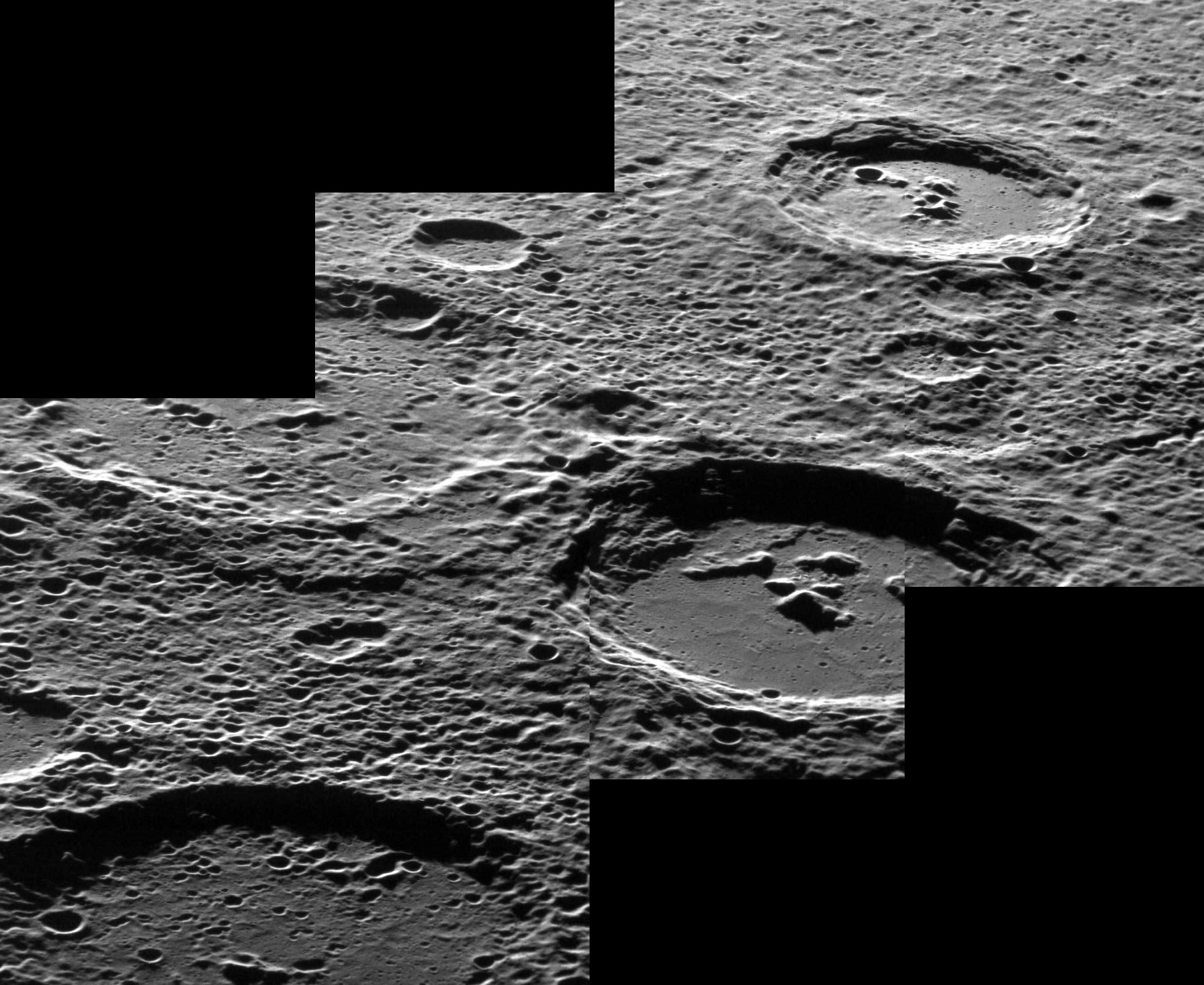
Neumann (left foreground), Equiano (right), and Mofolo (upper left) craters. The crater in upper right is unnamed.
