= Simonides (crater) =

Crater on Mercury

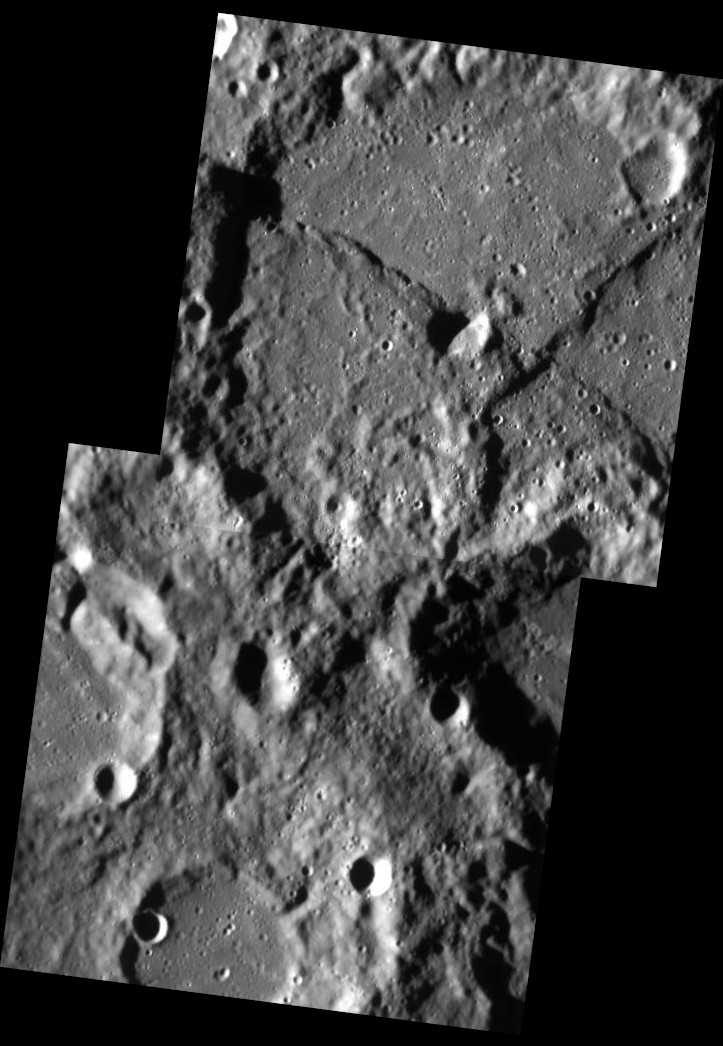
- MESSENGER NAC mosaic
- Planet: Mercury
- Coordinates: 29.13°S 44.85°W
- Quadrangle: Discovery
- Diameter: 87.0 km (54.1 mi)
- Eponym: Simonides of Ceos

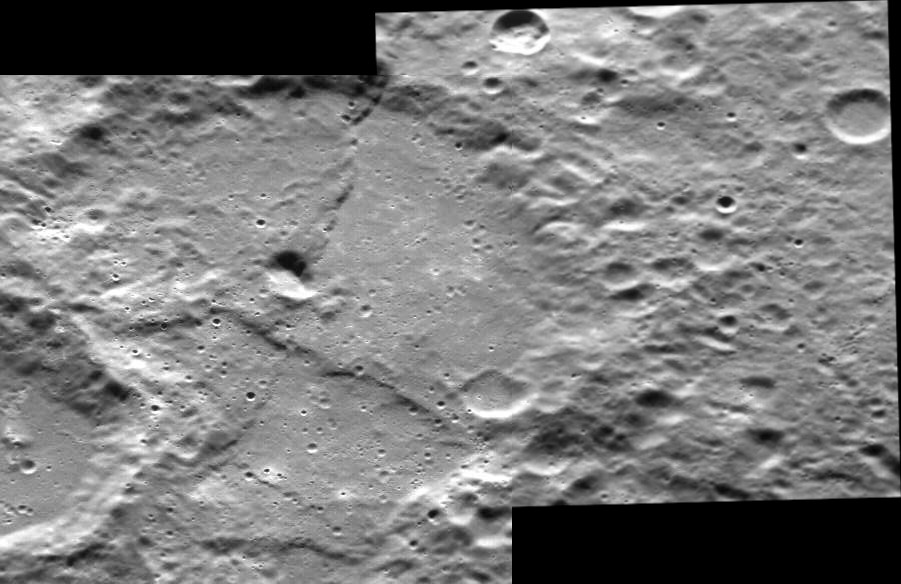
Oblique view

Simonides is a crater on Mercury. Its name was adopted by the International Astronomical Union (IAU) in 1985. The crater is named for Greek lyric poet Simonides. The crater was first imaged by Mariner 10 in 1974.

Simonides has a small, somewhat irregular pit in its center. Unnamed wrinkle ridges cross the floor of the crater, and one extends to the northwest and southeast.

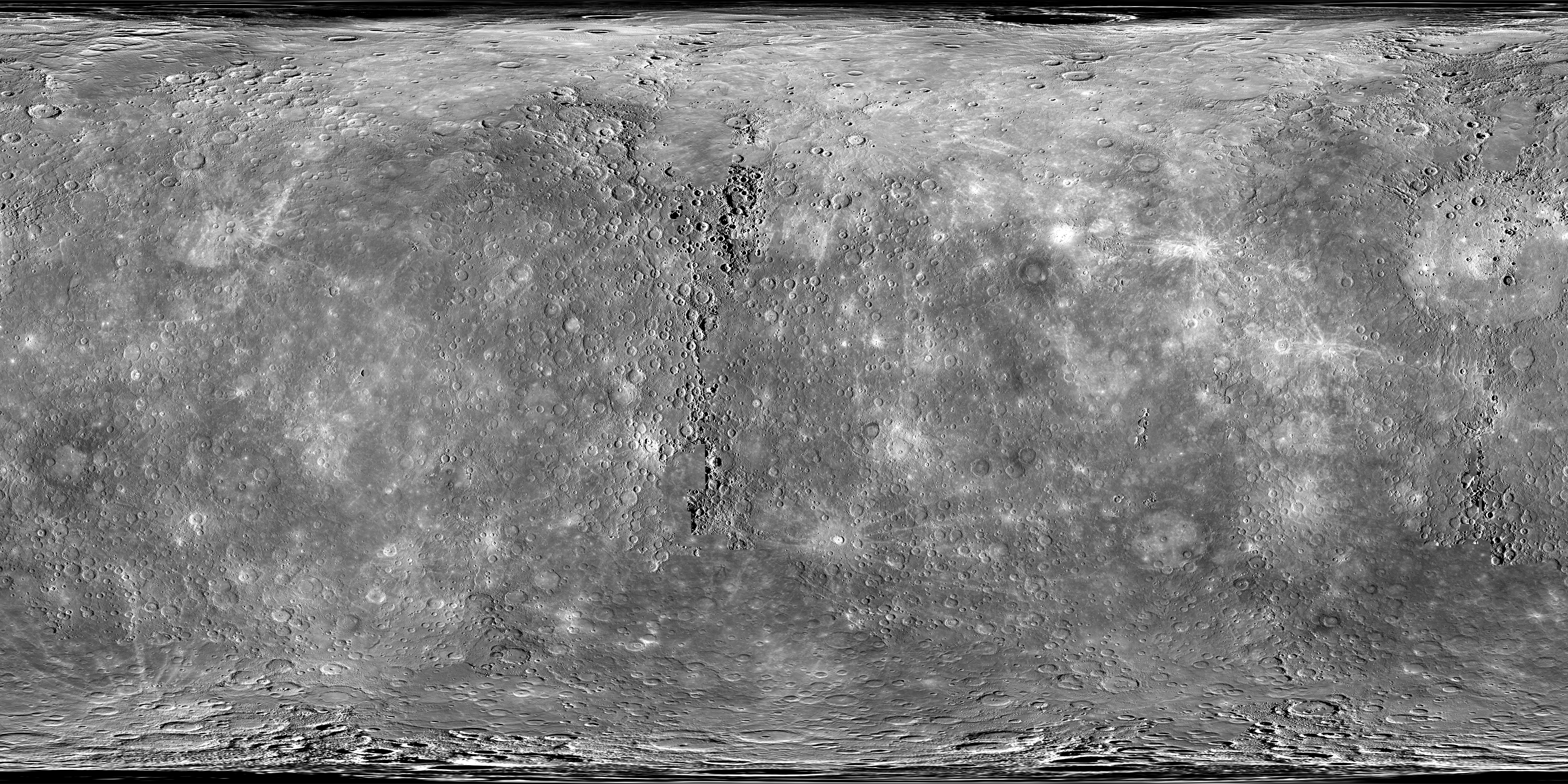
Mercury global map 2013-05-14 bright

The crater Ibsen is to the northeast of Simonides, and Rainey crater is to the southwest. Neumann is to the more distant southeast.
