= NGC 7741 =

Galaxy in the constellation Pegasus

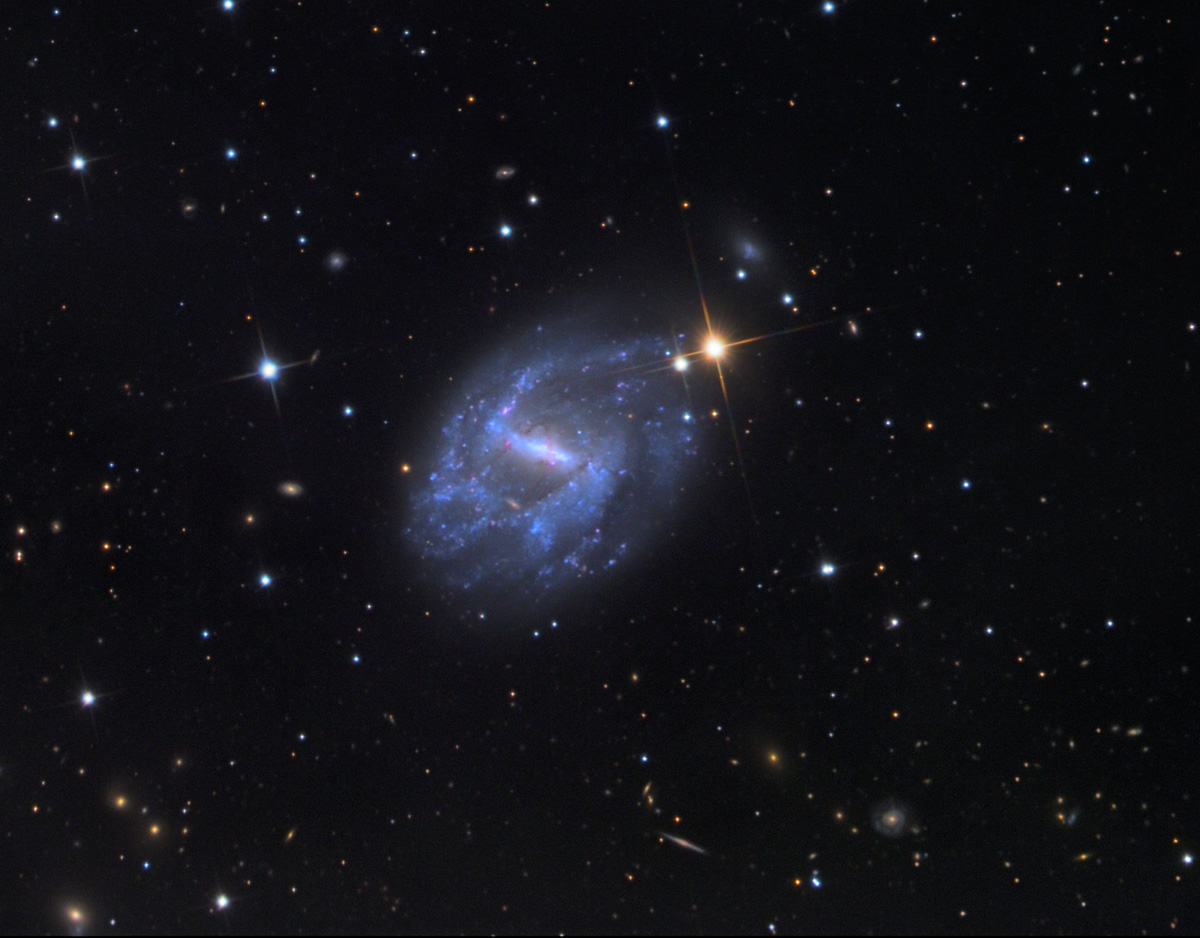
- NGC 7741 by the 32-inch Schulman Telescope at Mount Lemmon Observatory

Observation data (J2000 epoch)
- Constellation: Pegasus
- Right ascension: 23^{h} 43^{m} 54.4^{s}
- Declination: +26° 04′ 32″
- Redshift: 0.002502 ± 0.000001
- Heliocentric radial velocity: 750 ± 0 km/s
- Distance: 41.2 ± 6.9 Mly (12.6 ± 2.1 Mpc)
- Apparent magnitude (V): 11.0

Characteristics
- Type: SB(s)cd
- Apparent size (V): 4.4′ × 3.0′

Other designations
- UGC 12754, CGCG 476-125, MCG +04-55-050, PGC 72237

NGC 7741 is a barred spiral galaxy located in the constellation Pegasus. It is located at a distance of circa 40 million light years from Earth, which, given its apparent dimensions, means that NGC 7741 is about 50,000 light years across. It was discovered by William Herschel on September 10, 1784.

NGC 7741 has a strong bar and two spiral arms. The spiral arms are patchy and diffuse and their inner part forms a pseudoring. There are numerous HII regions along the bar and the spiral arms, and a total number of 10 HII region complexes have been observed, with radius 6 arcseconds. They have ages between 5 and 9 million years. The star formation rate in the central region of NGC 7741 is 0.022 M_{☉} per year per square kpc. The total stellar mass of NGC 7741 is estimated to be 1.69×10^{9} M_{☉}.

NGC 7741 belongs to a small galaxy group known as the NGC 7741 group. Other members of the group are the galaxies UGC 12732, and UGC 12791.

== Gallery ==
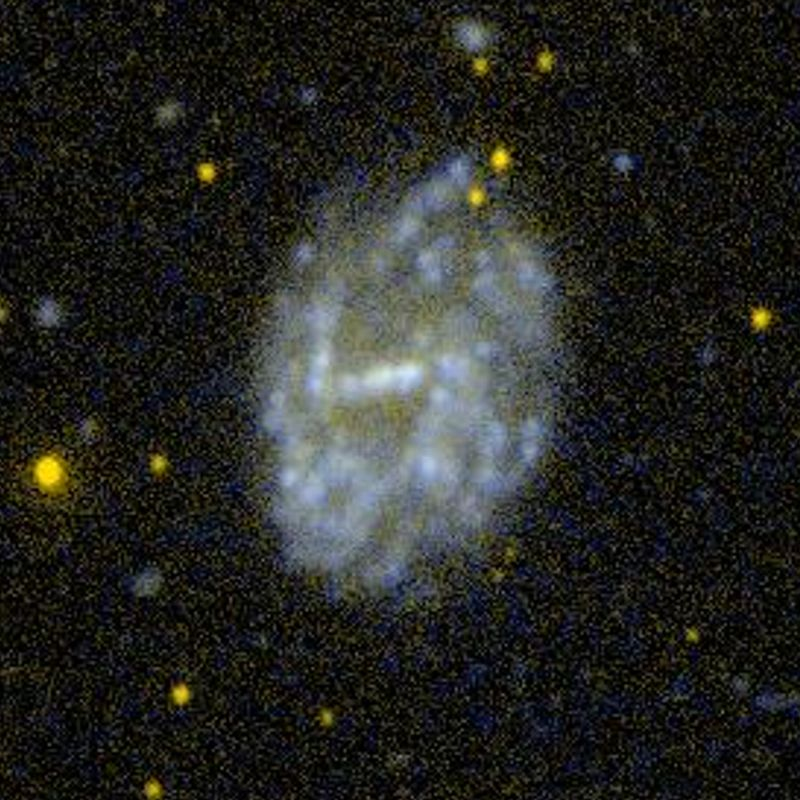
NGC 7741 by GALEX

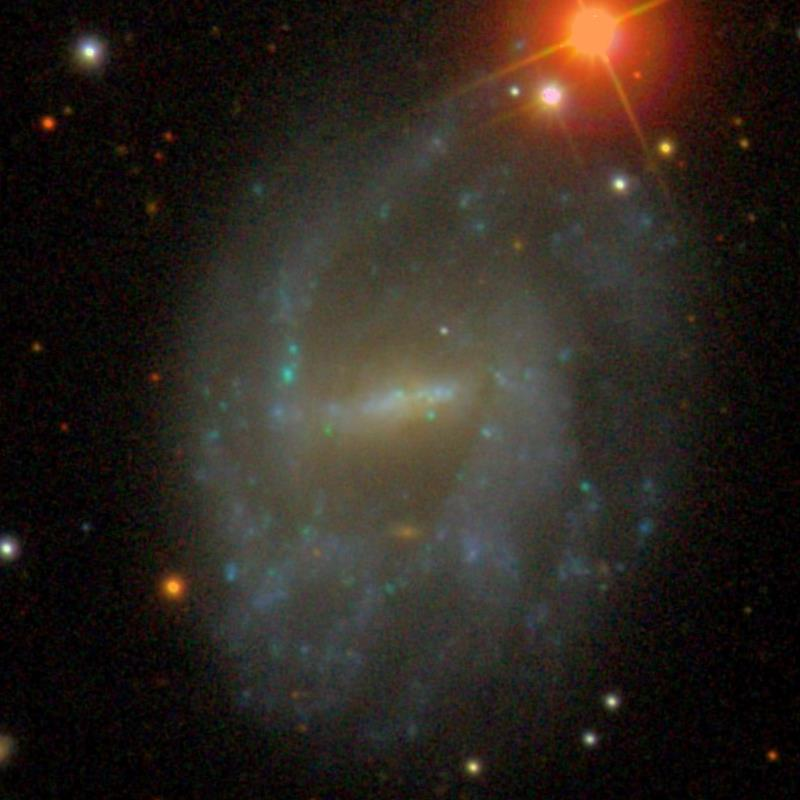
NGC 7741 (SDSS DR14)
