= Equiano (crater) =

Crater on Mercury

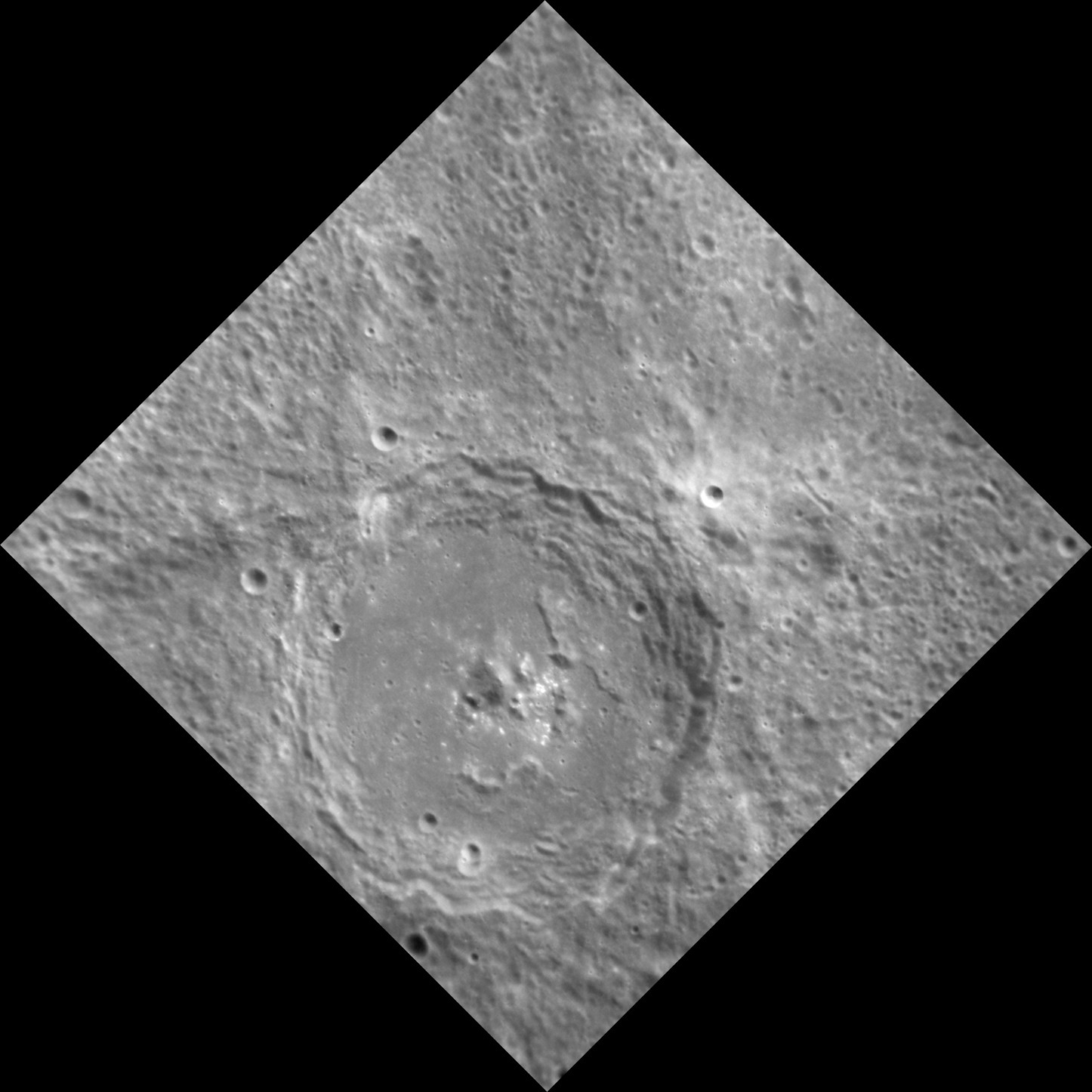
- MESSENGER NAC image of Equiano
- Feature type: Central-peak impact crater
- Location: Discovery quadrangle, Mercury
- Coordinates: 40.0°S 30.59°W
- Diameter: 102.0 km (63.4 mi)
- Eponym: Olaudah Equiano

Equiano is a crater on Mercury. It has a diameter of 102 kilometers. Its name was adopted by the International Astronomical Union in 1976. Equiano is named for the abolitionist writer Olaudah Equiano, who lived from 1750 to 1797. The crater was first imaged by Mariner 10 in 1974.

Equiano has patches of bright material near its central peak, and these may be hollows.

To the northeast of Equiano is Mofolo crater, and to the northwest is Neumann crater.

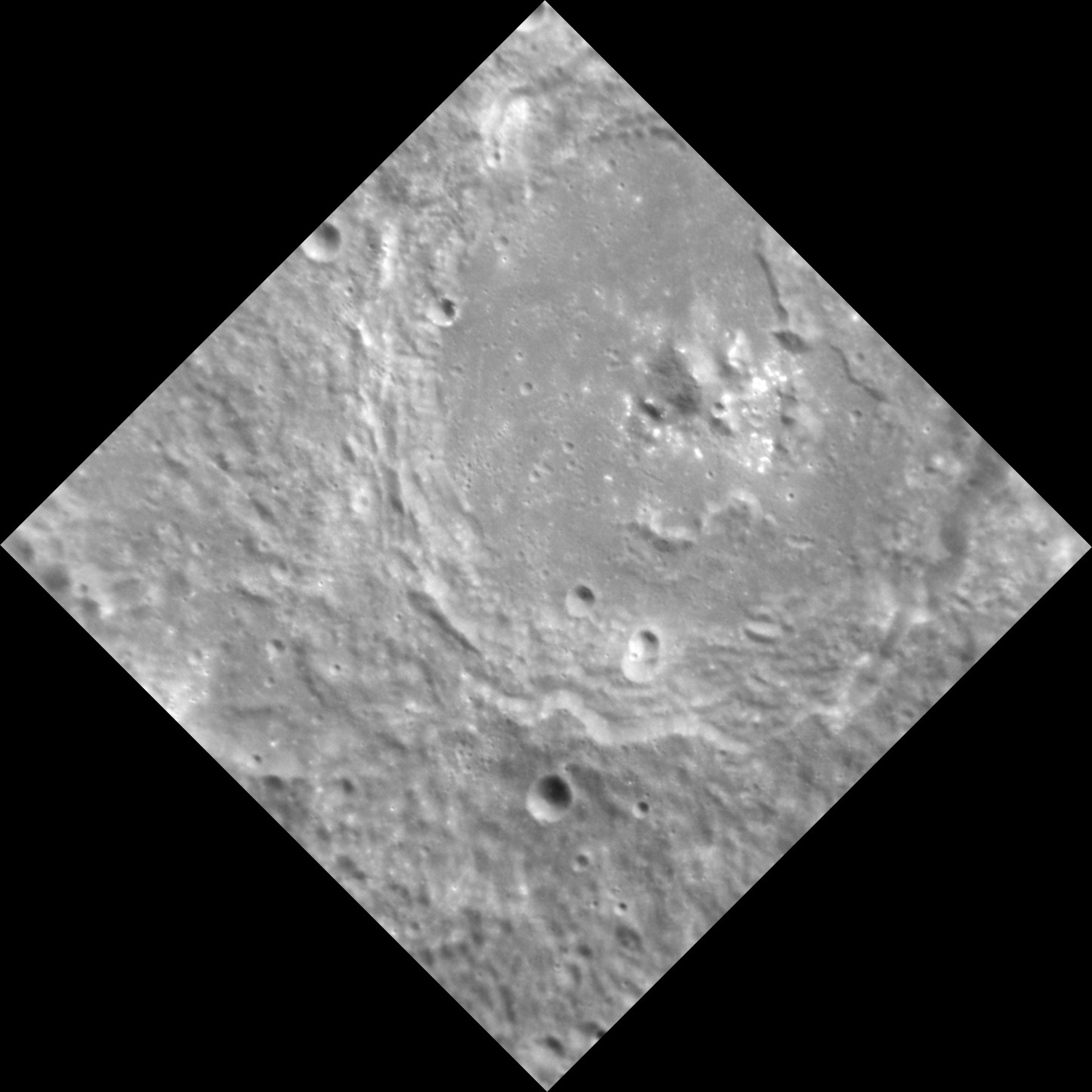
Higher resolution view showing the hollows around the central peak

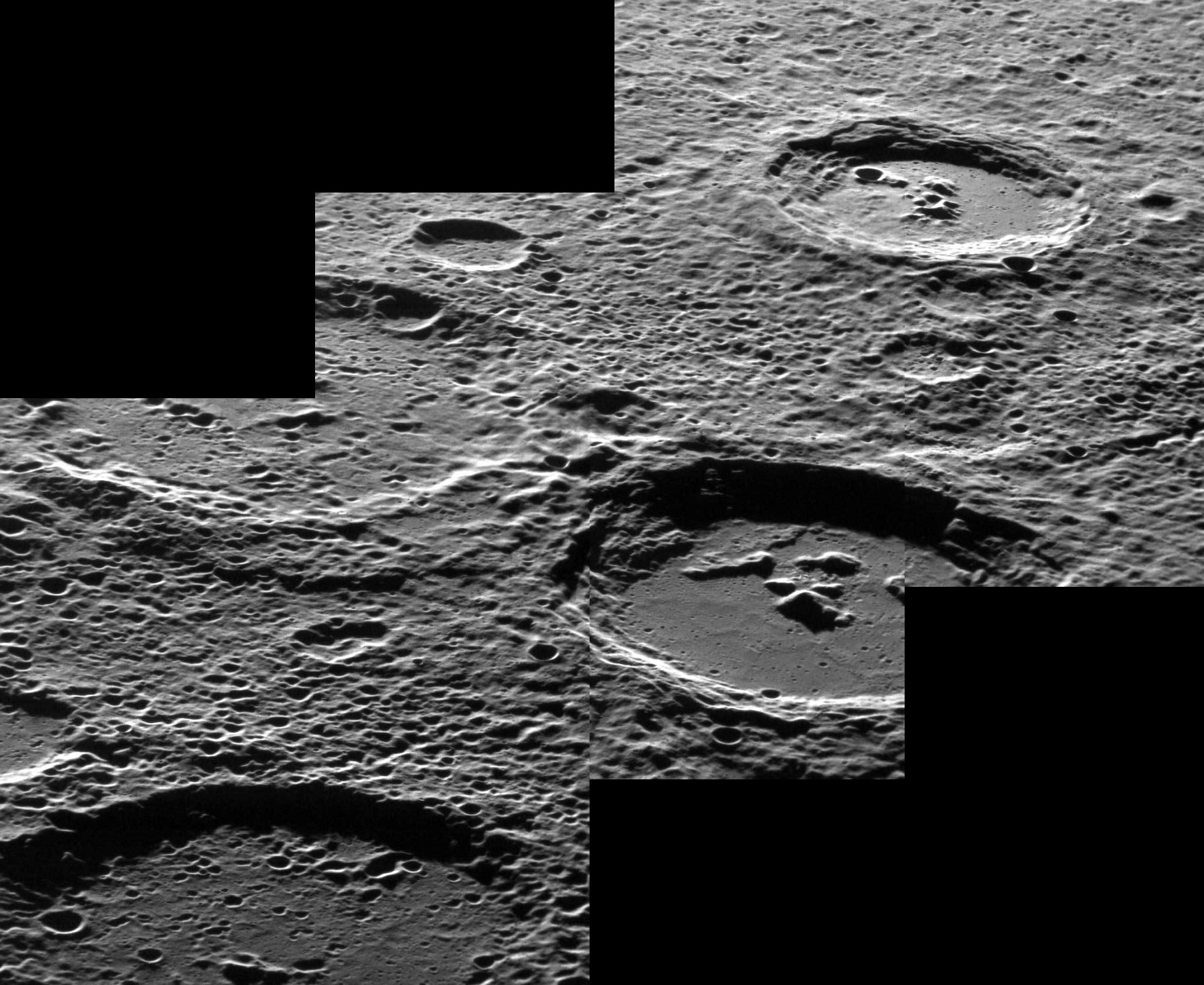
Neumann (left foreground), Equiano (right), and Mofolo (upper left) craters. The crater in upper right is unnamed.
