= Arecibo Catena =

Mercurial catena

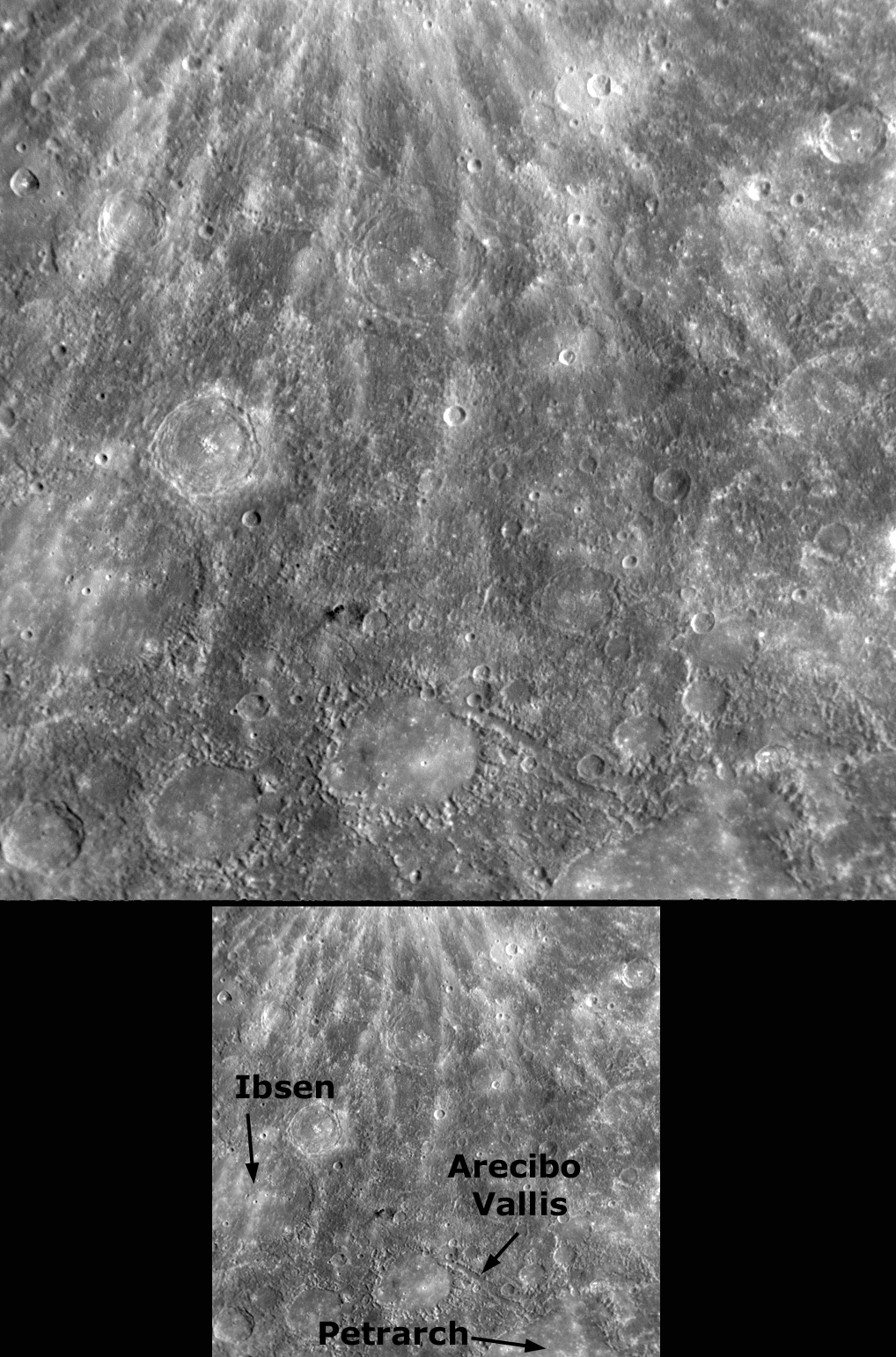
- Photograph by MESSENGER showing Arecibo Catena and nearby craters
- Feature type: Catena
- Coordinates: 27.5°S 28.4°W
- Eponym: Arecibo Observatory

Arecibo Catena (Arecibo Valles until March 2013) is a catena on Mercury. It is named after Arecibo Observatory, the former large radio telescope in Puerto Rico. It was originally named Arecibo Valles, but the name was changed on 26 March 2013 to align with planetary feature naming themes.

It is located at latitude 27.5 S, longitude 28.4 W, in the hilly and chaotic terrain antipodal to Caloris Basin.

Arecibo Catena is connected to Petrarch crater.
