= GALEX Arecibo SDSS Survey =

Galaxy survey

- Alternative names: GASS

GALEX Arecibo SDSS Survey (GASS) is a large targeted survey at Arecibo Observatory that has been underway since 2008 to measure the neutral hydrogen content of a representative sample of approximately 1000 massive galaxies selected using the Sloan Digital Sky Survey and GALEX imaging surveys. The telescope being used is the world's largest single-dish radio telescope and can receive signals from distant objects.

== See also ==
- GALEX
- Sloan Digital Sky Survey
- Radio astronomy
