= GALEX =

NASA UV space telescope of the Explorer program

Galaxy Evolution Explorer
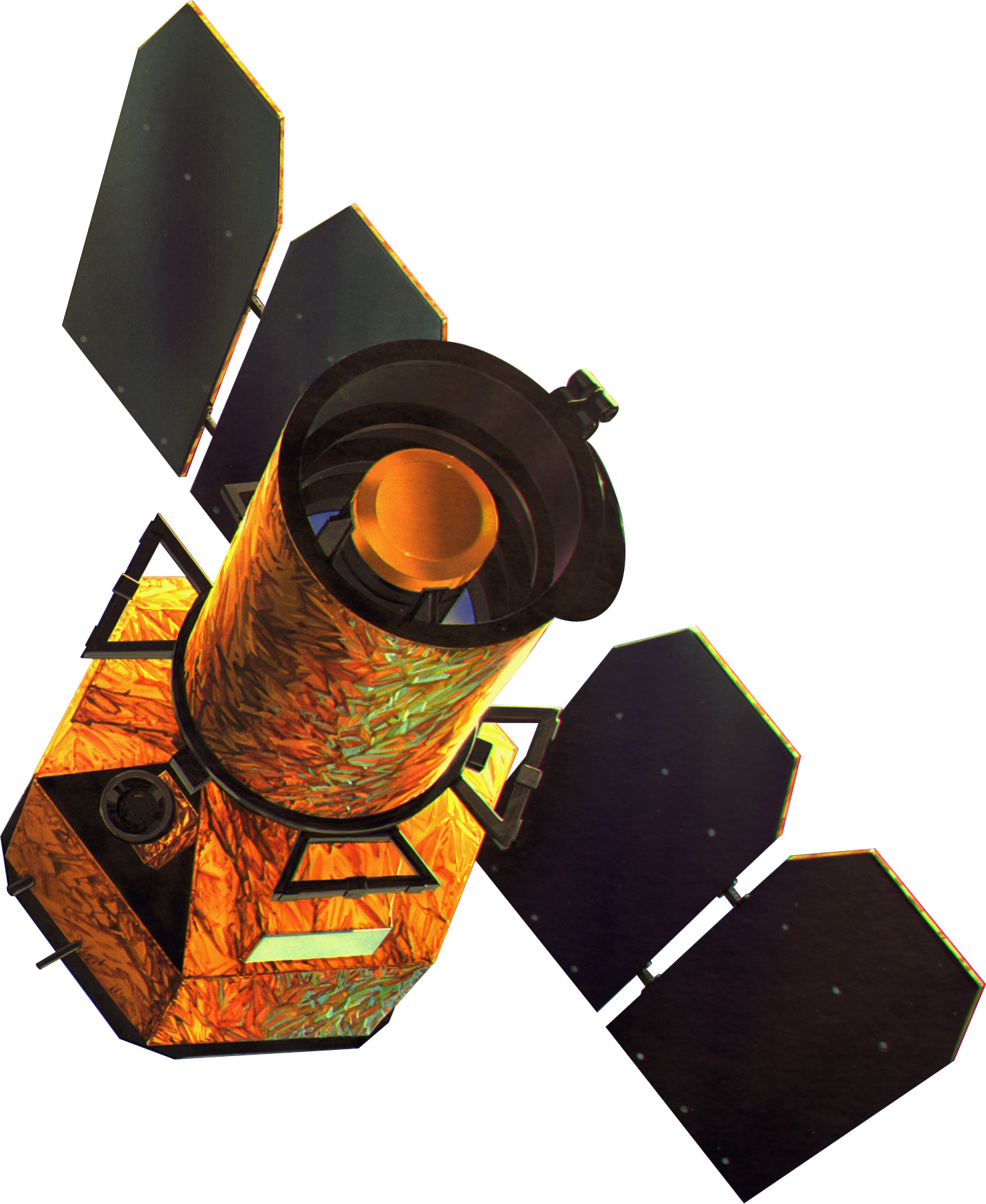
- GALEX spacecraft
- Names: Explorer-83; SMEX-7
- Mission type: Ultraviolet astronomy
- Operator: NASA / JPL (2003–2012); Caltech (2012–2013)
- COSPAR ID: 2003-017A
- SATCAT no.: 27783
- Website: https://www.galex.caltech.edu/
- Mission duration: 29 months (planned); 10 years, 2 months (achieved)

Spacecraft properties
- Spacecraft: Explorer LXXXIII
- Spacecraft type: Galaxy Evolution Explorer
- Bus: Orbview 4
- Manufacturer: Orbital Sciences Corporation
- Launch mass: 280 kg (620 lb)
- Dimensions: 1 × 2.5 m (3 ft 3 in × 8 ft 2 in)
- Power: 290 watts

Start of mission
- Launch date: 28 April 2003, 11:59:57 UTC
- Rocket: Pegasus XL (F33)
- Launch site: Cape Canaveral, Stargazer
- Contractor: Orbital Sciences Corporation
- Entered service: 28 May 2003

End of mission
- Deactivated: 28 June 2013, 19:09 UTC
- Last contact: 28 June 2013
- Decay date: 2068 (planned)

Orbital parameters
- Reference system: Geocentric orbit
- Regime: Low Earth orbit
- Perigee altitude: 691 km (429 mi)
- Apogee altitude: 697 km (433 mi)
- Inclination: 29.00°
- Period: 98.60 minutes
- Revolution no.: 85423

Main telescope
- Type: Ritchey–Chrétien
- Diameter: 50 cm (20 in)
- Focal length: f/6.0
- Wavelengths: 135–280 nm (Ultraviolet)

Instruments
- Ultraviolet telescope

Galaxy Evolution Explorer (GALEX or Explorer 83 or SMEX-7) was a NASA orbiting space telescope designed to observe the universe in ultraviolet wavelengths to measure the history of star formation in the universe. In addition to paving the way for future ultraviolet missions, the space telescope allowed astronomers to uncover mysteries about the early universe and how it evolved, as well as better characterize phenomena like black holes and dark matter. GALEX was launched on 28 April 2003 for a 29-month primary mission, which was extended three times before the spacecraft was placed into standby mode on 7 February 2012, and decommissioned in June 2013.

== Spacecraft ==
The spacecraft was three-axis stabilized, with power coming from four fixed gallium arsenide (GaAs) solar cells which supply nearly 300 watts to the spacecraft. The satellite bus is from Orbital Sciences Corporation based on OrbView 4. The telescope was a 50 cm (20 in) Modified Ritchey–Chrétien with a rotating grism. GALEX used the first ever UV light dichroic beam-splitter flown in space to direct photons to its Near UV (175–280 nanometers) and Far UV (135–174 nanometers) microchannel plate detectors. Each of the two detectors was 65 mm (2.6 in) in diameter. The target orbit was 670 km (420 mi) circular and inclined at 29.00° to the equator.

== Launch ==
An air launched Pegasus launch vehicle, launched on 28 April 2003 at 11:59:57 UTC, placed the craft into a nearly circular orbit at an altitude of 697 km (433 mi) and an orbital inclination to the Earth's equator of 29.00°.

== Mission ==
The Galaxy Evolution Explorer (GALEX) explored the origin and evolution of galaxies, and the origins of stars and heavy elements over the redshift range of Z between 0 and 2. GALEX conducted an all-sky imaging survey, a deep imaging survey, and a survey of 200 galaxies nearest to the Milky Way galaxy. As well, GALEX performed three spectroscopic surveys over the 135–300 nanometre band. GALEX had a planned 29-month mission, and is a part of the Small Explorer (SMEX) program.

The first observation, taken on 21 May 2003, was in the constellation Hercules, and was dedicated to the crew of the Space Shuttle Columbia. This region was selected because it had been directly overhead the shuttle at the time of its last contact with the NASA Mission Control Center, Houston, Texas.

After its primary mission of 29 months, observation operations were extended. In 2009, one of its detectors, which observed in far-ultraviolet light, stopped functioning. Late in the mission, observations of more intense UV sources were allowed, including the Kepler field.

Observation operations were extended to almost 9 years, with NASA placing it into standby mode on 7 February 2012. NASA cut off financial support for operations of GALEX in early February 2011 as it was ranked lower than other projects which were seeking a limited supply of funding. The mission's life-cycle cost to NASA was US$150.6 million. The California Institute of Technology (Caltech) negotiated to transfer control of GALEX and its associated ground control equipment to the California Institute of Technology in keeping with the Stevenson-Wydler Technology Innovation Act. Under this Act, excess research equipment owned by the U.S. government can be transferred to educational institutions and non-profit organizations. On 17 May 2012, GALEX operations were transferred to Caltech.

On 28 June 2013, NASA decommissioned GALEX. It is expected that the spacecraft will remain in orbit until at least 2068 before it will re-enter the atmosphere.

== Science mission ==
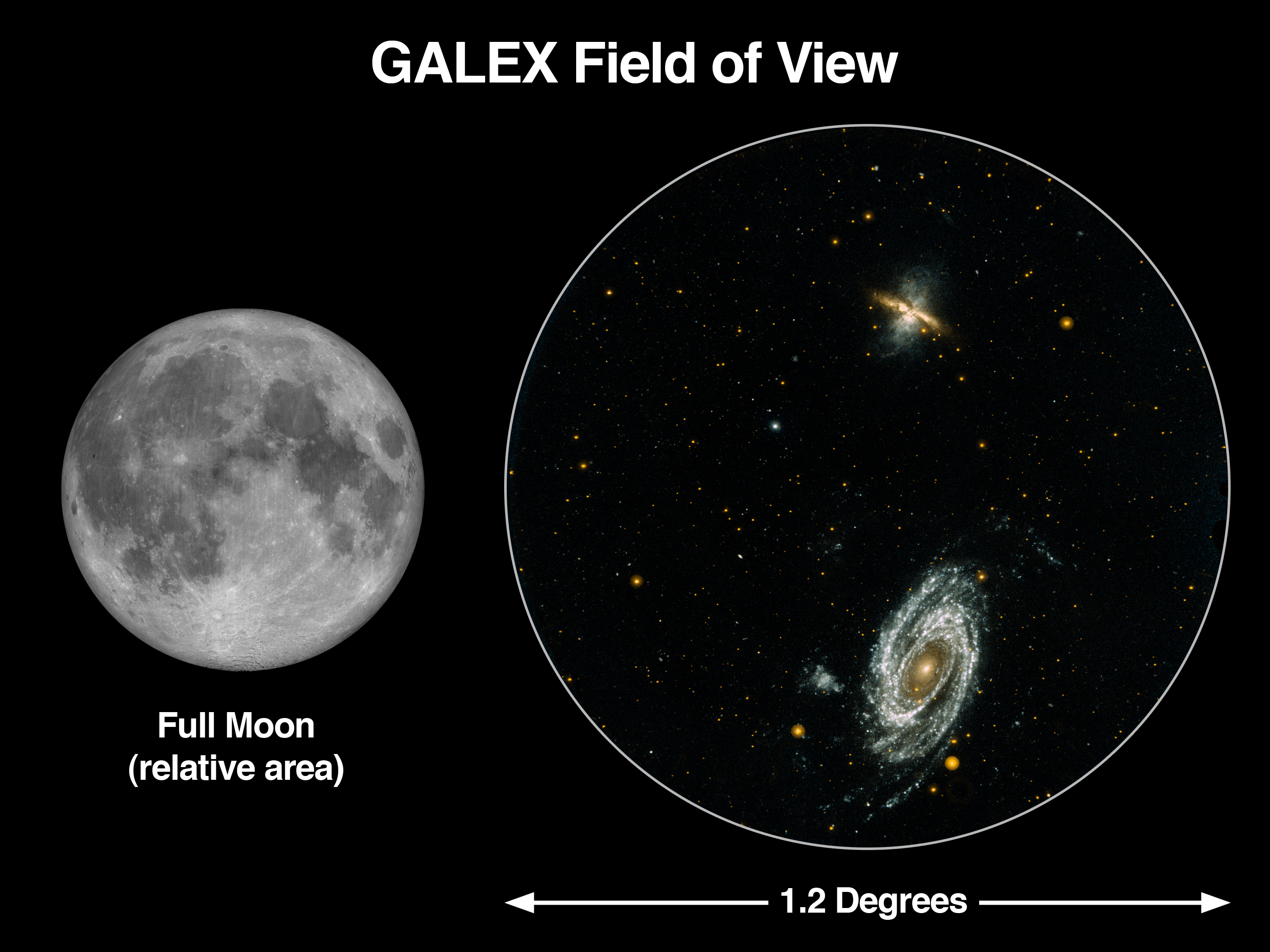
GALEX field of view compared to a full Moon

The telescope made observations in ultraviolet wavelengths to measure the history of star formation in the universe 80% of the way back to the Big Bang. Since scientists have evidence that the Universe is about 13.8 billion years old, the mission studied galaxies and stars across about 10 billion years of cosmic history.

The spacecraft's mission was to observe hundreds of thousands of galaxies, with the goal of determining the distance of each galaxy from Earth and the rate of star formation in each galaxy. Near-UV (NUV) and Far-UV (FUV) emissions as measured by GALEX can indicate the presence of young stars, but may also originate from old stellar populations (e.g. sdB stars).

Partnering with the NASA Jet Propulsion Laboratory (JPL) on the mission were the California Institute of Technology, Orbital Sciences Corporation, University of California, Berkeley, Yonsei University, Johns Hopkins University, Columbia University, and Laboratoire d'Astrophysique de Marseille, France.

The observatory participated in GOALS with Spitzer Space Telescope, Chandra X-ray Observatory, and Hubble Space Telescope. GOALS stands for Great Observatories All-sky LIRG Survey, and Luminous Infrared Galaxies were studied at the multiple wavelengths allowed by the telescopes.

== Science objectives ==
The primary objective of the Galaxy Evolution Explorer was to learn what factors trigger star formation inside galaxies; how quickly stars form, evolve and die; and how heavy chemical elements form in stars. Additional goals include:

- Determining how fast stars are forming inside each galaxy
- Determining when and how the stars we see today formed
- Creating the first map of the ultraviolet universe
- Helping scientists find and understand ultraviolet bright quasars. These objects can serve as background sources for the Hubble Space Telescope and FUSE as it probes the gases from which galaxies form stars

To accomplish its objectives, the Galaxy Evolution Explorer conducted eight surveys, grouped into two broad categories – a local universe investigation and a star formation history investigation. The local universe investigation includes the following four surveys:

- All-sky imaging survey – will look at the entire sky and develop a comprehensive catalogue of ultraviolet galaxy images, useful to map the distribution of star formation within the local universe
- Nearby galaxy survey – will study about 150 nearby galaxies that are familiar to scientists to understand how stars formed in individual galaxies
- Wide-field spectroscopic survey – will analyze the light wavelengths of galaxies in a wide swath of the sky
- Medium spectroscopic survey – will examine the light properties of galaxies within a narrower portion of the sky

The star formation history investigation will take information gathered by the local universe investigation and apply it to more distant galaxies by looking further back in time. It includes the following four surveys:

- Deep imaging survey – will look at a portion of the sky to study the distribution of star formation in the deep universe
- Deep spectroscopic survey – will look for the most distant galaxies
- Ultra-deep imaging survey – will look as deep as possible at a very small portion of the sky
- Medium imaging survey – will study star formation in galaxies beyond our local cosmic neighborhood, but not as deep as the deep imaging survey

== Telescope specifications ==
GALEX carries a single f/6.0, Ritchey–Chrétien telescope, with a 50 cm (20 in) diameter primary, and a 22 cm (8.7 in) secondary mirror. It can see light wavelengths from 135 nanometres to 280-nm. Beam-splitters direct the Near UV (NUV) and Far UV (FUV) components to separate photoelectric detectors of diameter 6.5 cm (2.6 in). In each, the photoelectrons are multiplied by a microchannel plate, and detected by the anode grid. The grid enables determination of the exact position of electron impact, by the time delay of each pulse at the two ends. The telescope has a field of view (FoV) of 1.2°, and a resolution of five arcseconds, and enables either imaging or spectral composition of a single star/galaxy, by a rotatable wheel containing a clear window and a grism (a cross between a grating and a prism).

== Pre-launch images ==
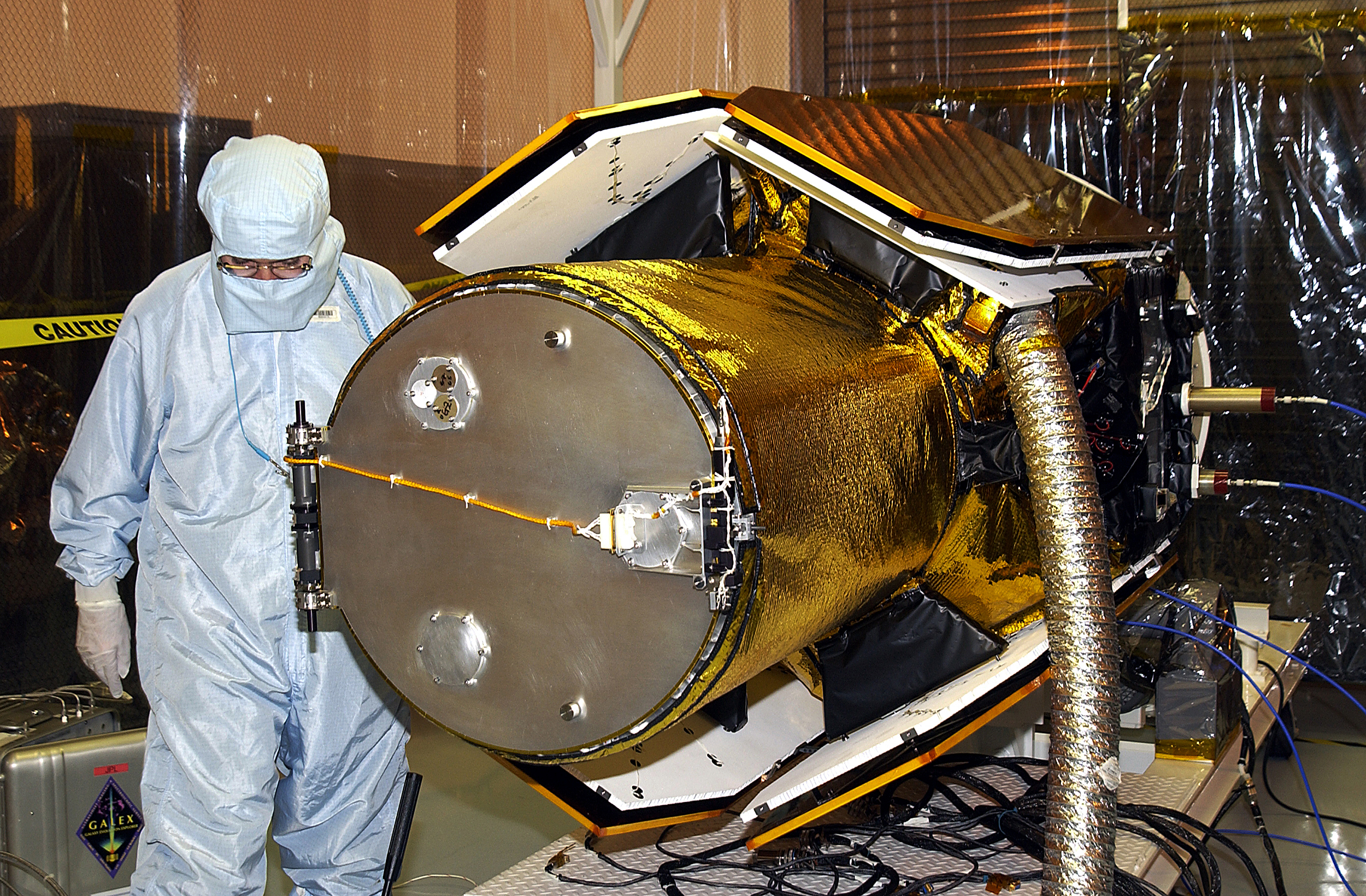
GALEX at the pre-launch tests

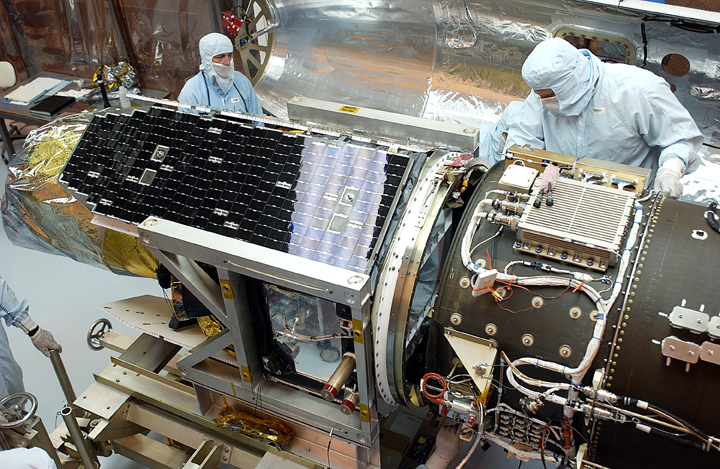
GALEX being mated to a Pegasus XL launch vehicle

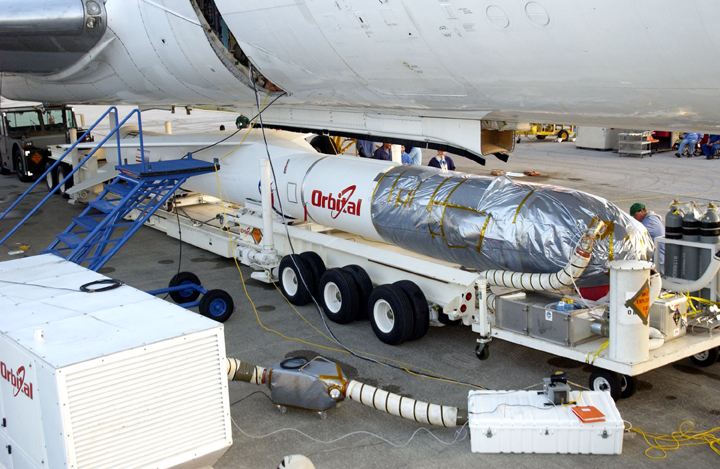
GALEX's Pegasus XL being attached to the Lockheed L-1011 Stargazer

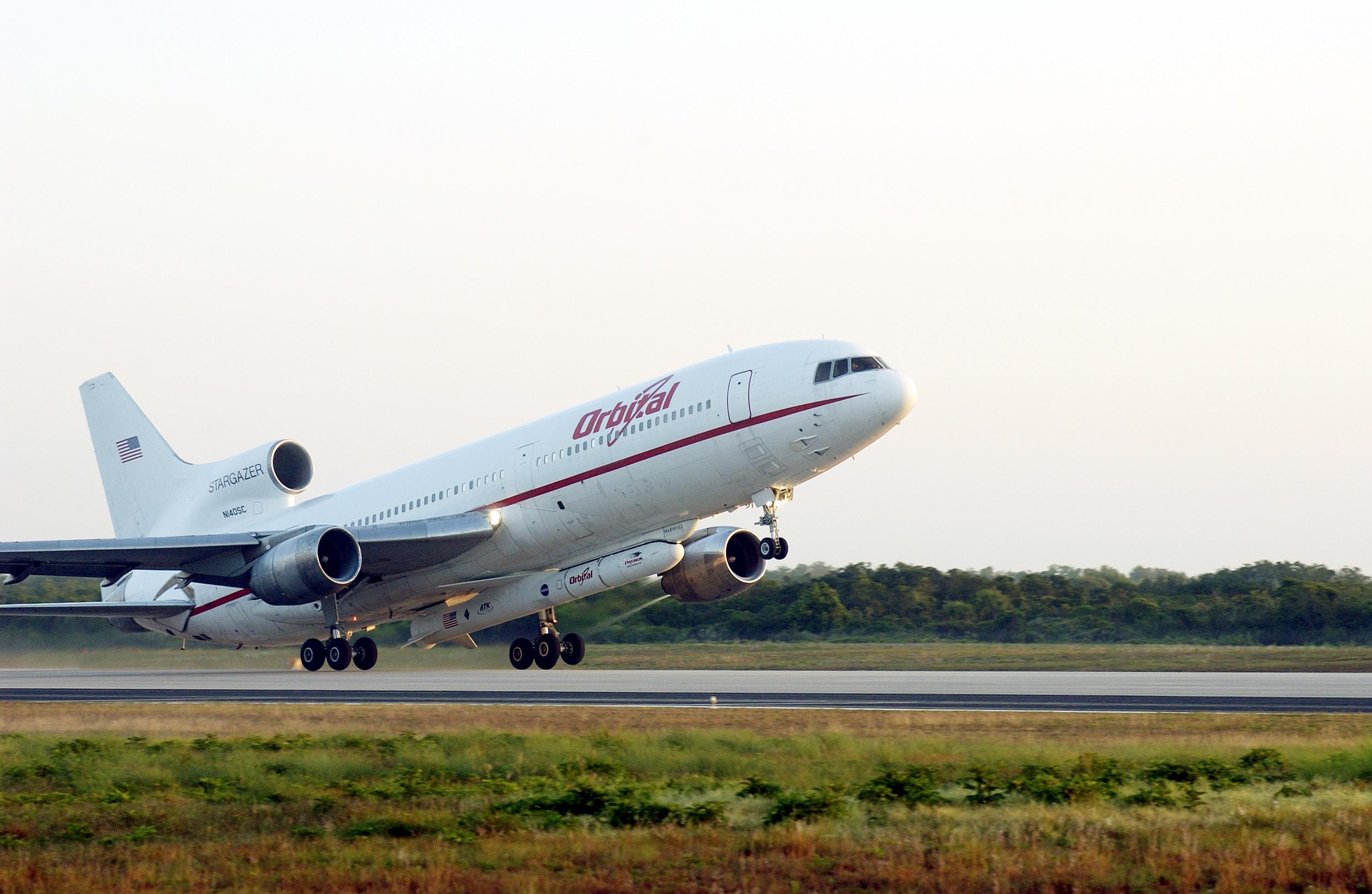
The L-1011 Stargazer take-off with GALEX attached under-belly

== See also ==
- Explorer program – Ongoing NASA space exploration program
- Ultraviolet astronomy
- GALEX Arecibo SDSS Survey
- Arecibo Observatory
- Galaxy And Mass Assembly survey, with GALEX participation
