= Neumann (crater) =

Crater on Mercury

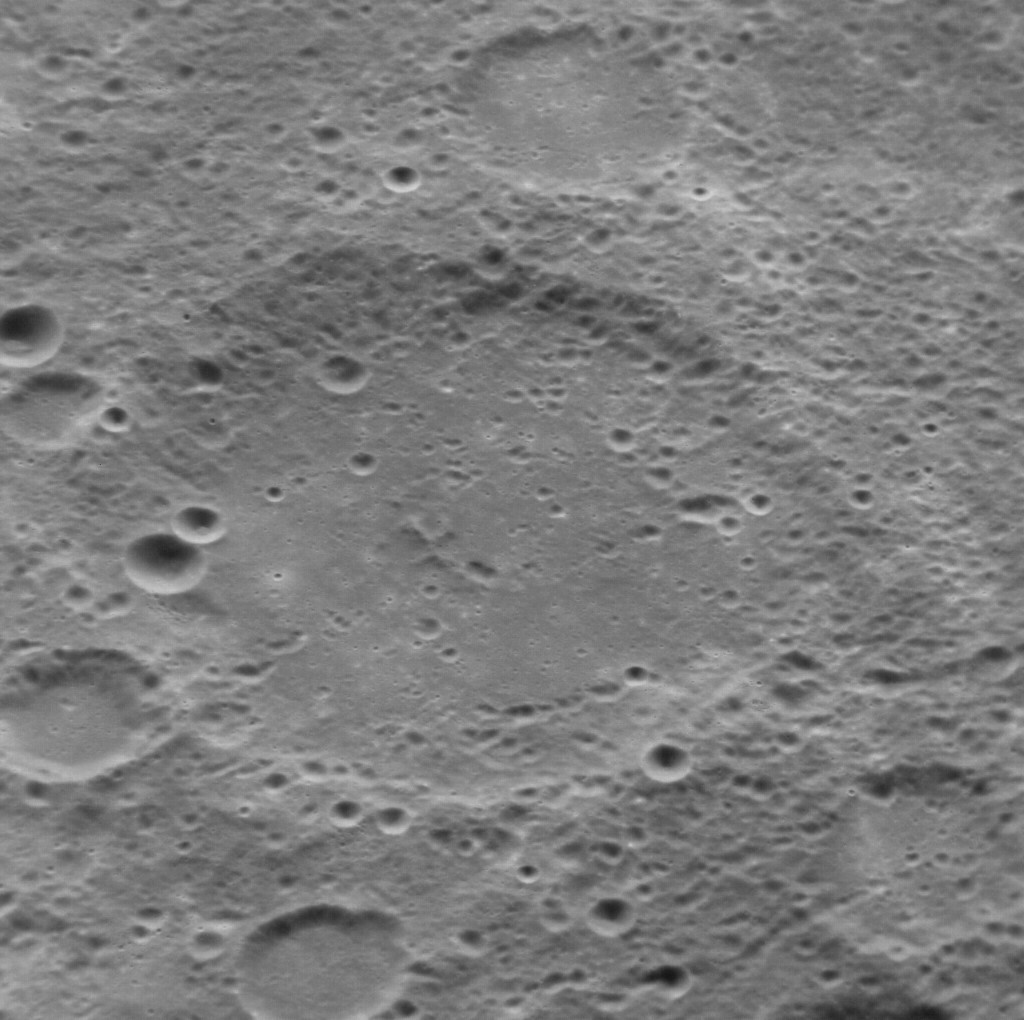
- MESSENGER NAC of Neumann
- Feature type: Impact crater
- Location: Discovery quadrangle, Mercury
- Coordinates: 37.22°S 34.56°W
- Diameter: 122.0 km (75.8 mi)
- Eponym: Johann Balthasar Neumann

Neumann is a crater on Mercury. It has a diameter of 120 kilometers. Its name was adopted by the International Astronomical Union (IAU) in 1976. Neumann is named for the German architect Johann Balthasar Neumann, who lived from 1687 to 1753. The crater was first imaged by Mariner 10 in 1974.

To the east of Neumann is Mofolo crater, and to the southeast is Equiano crater. To the southwest are the Mirni Rupes.

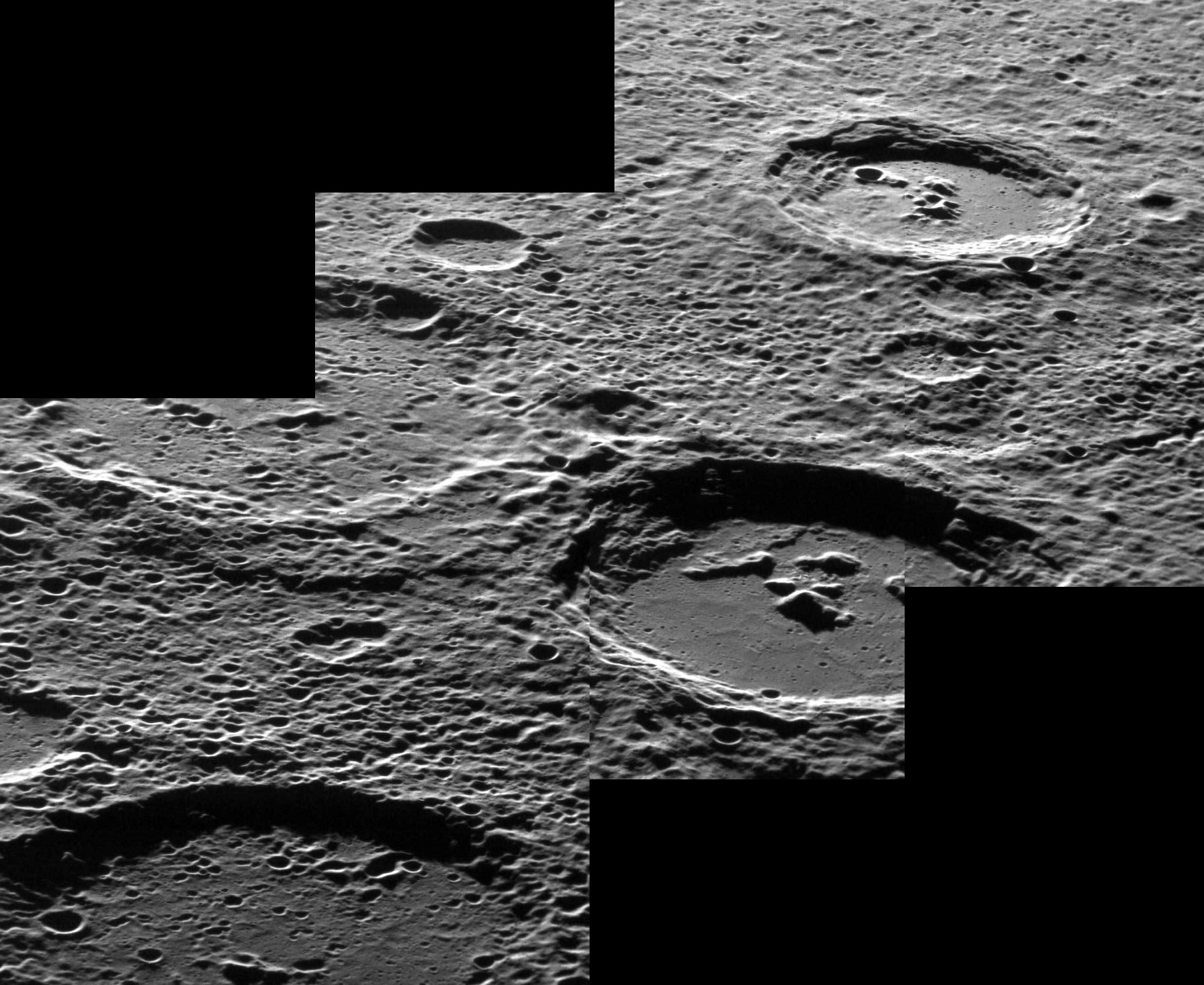
Neumann (left foreground), Equiano (right), and Mofolo (upper left) craters. The crater in upper right is unnamed.
