= Petrarch (crater) =

Crater on Mercury

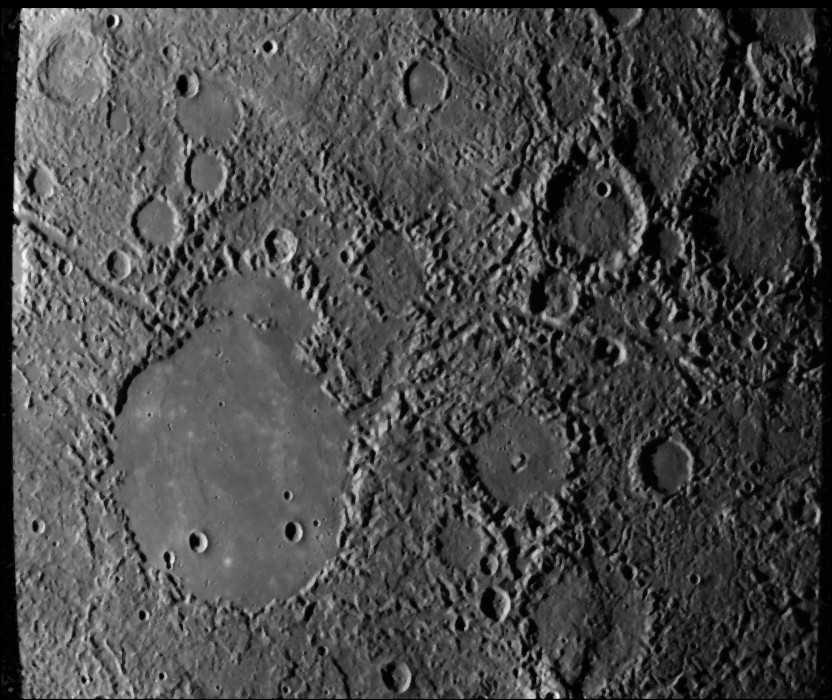
- Petrarch is the large crater to the lower left Mariner 10 image
- Feature type: Impact crater
- Location: Discovery quadrangle, Mercury
- Coordinates: 30°S 26.5°W
- Diameter: 170 km
- Eponym: Petrarch

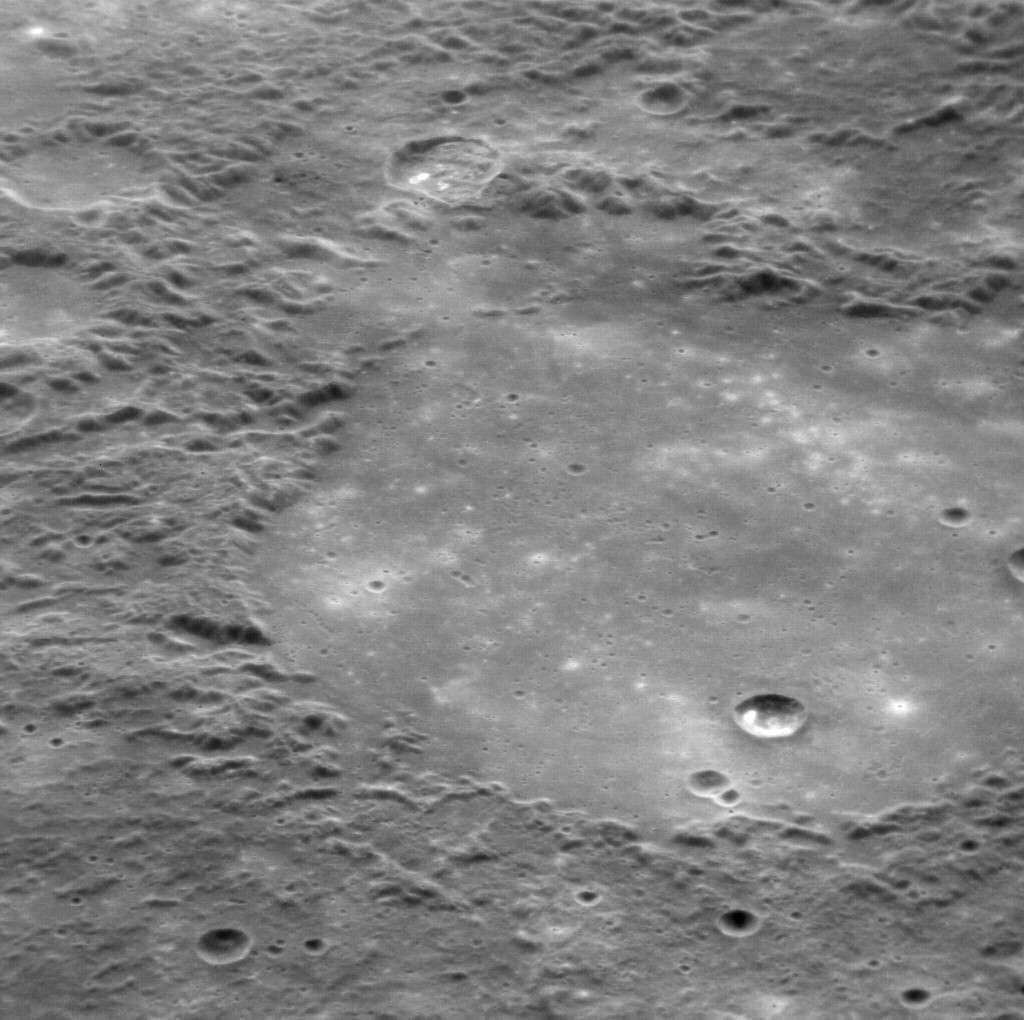
Oblique view of Petrarch crater by MESSENGER

Petrarch is a crater on Mercury. This crater is located within the distorted terrain on the opposite side of the planet from the Caloris Basin. It was named after Petrarch, the medieval Italian poet, by the IAU in 1976.

== See also ==
- List of craters on Mercury
