= Gibran (crater) =

Crater on Mercury

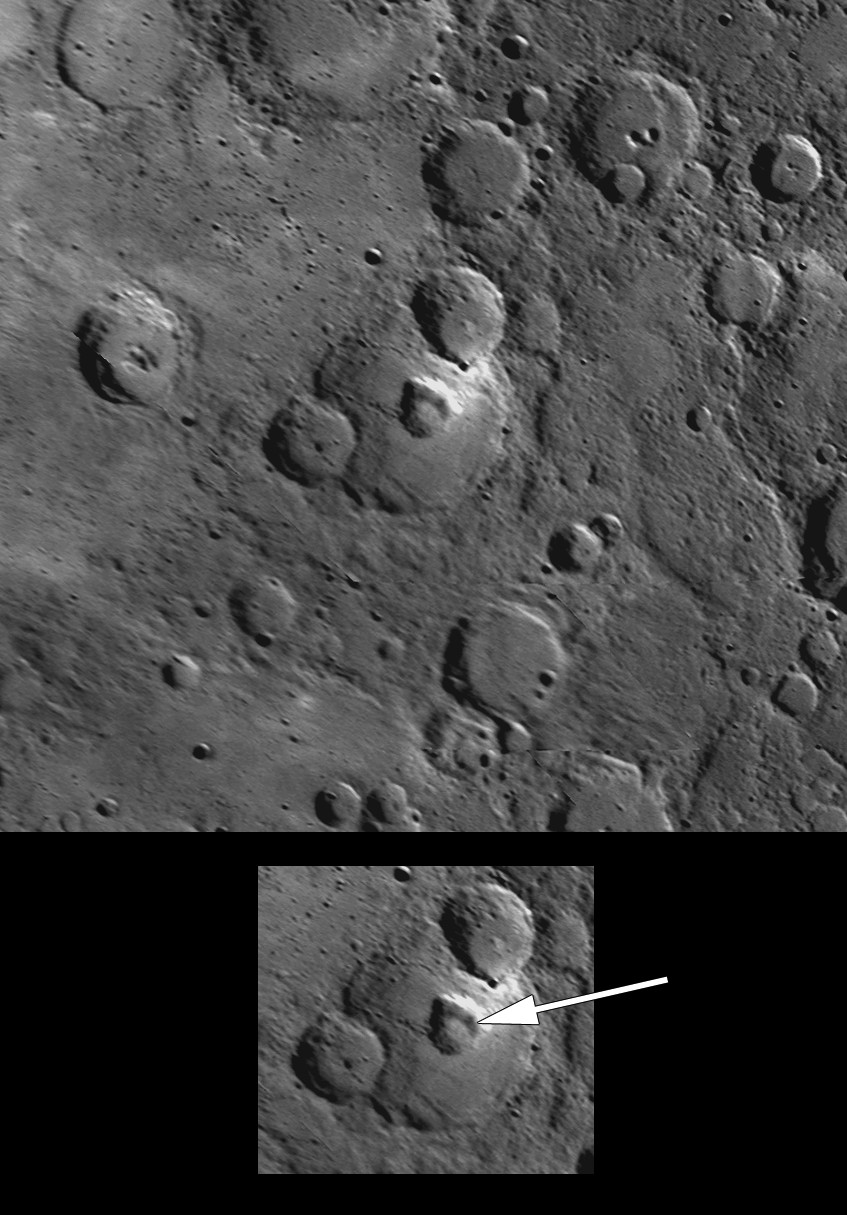
- An image of Gibran and surrounding regions; arrow indicates pit crater within Gibran in the bottom inset
- Feature type: Impact crater
- Location: Shakespeare quadrangle, Mercury
- Coordinates: 35.73°N 111.44°W
- Diameter: 106 km (66 mi)
- Eponym: Khalil Gibran

Gibran is a crater on Mercury and is in the east of the Shakespeare quadrangle. It was named after Lebanese-American poet Khalil Gibran in 2009. Gibran is located east of the rayed crater of Degas and nearby Damer.

The crater was discovered by the Mariner 10 spacecraft in 1974, but was not named until 2009. It contains a large (29 × 29 km), nearly circular pit crater.

Multiple examples of pit craters have been observed on Mercury on the floors of impact craters, leading to the name pit-floor craters for the impact structures that host these features (see also Beckett, Glinka, and Picasso). Unlike impact craters, pit craters are rimless, often irregularly shaped, steep-sided, and often display no associated ejecta or lava flows. These pit craters are thought to be evidence of shallow volcanic activity and may have formed when retreating magma caused an unsupported area of the surface to collapse, creating a pit. They are analogs of Earth's volcanic calderas. Pit-floor craters may provide an indication of internal igneous processes where other evidence of volcanic processes is absent or ambiguous. The discovery of multiple pit-floor craters augments evidence that volcanic activity has been a widespread process in the geologic evolution of Mercury's crust.

== Views ==
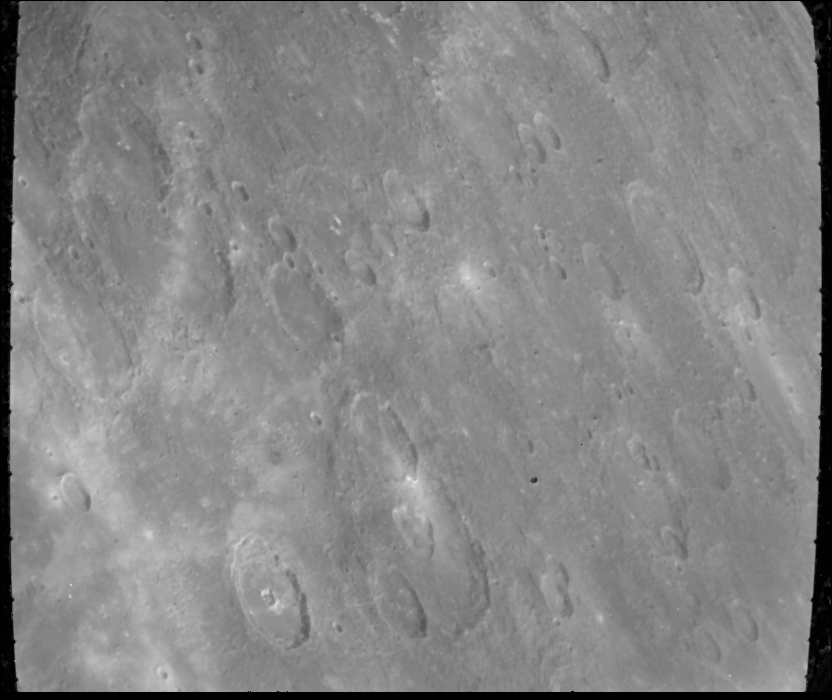
Mariner 10 image with Gibran at bottom center

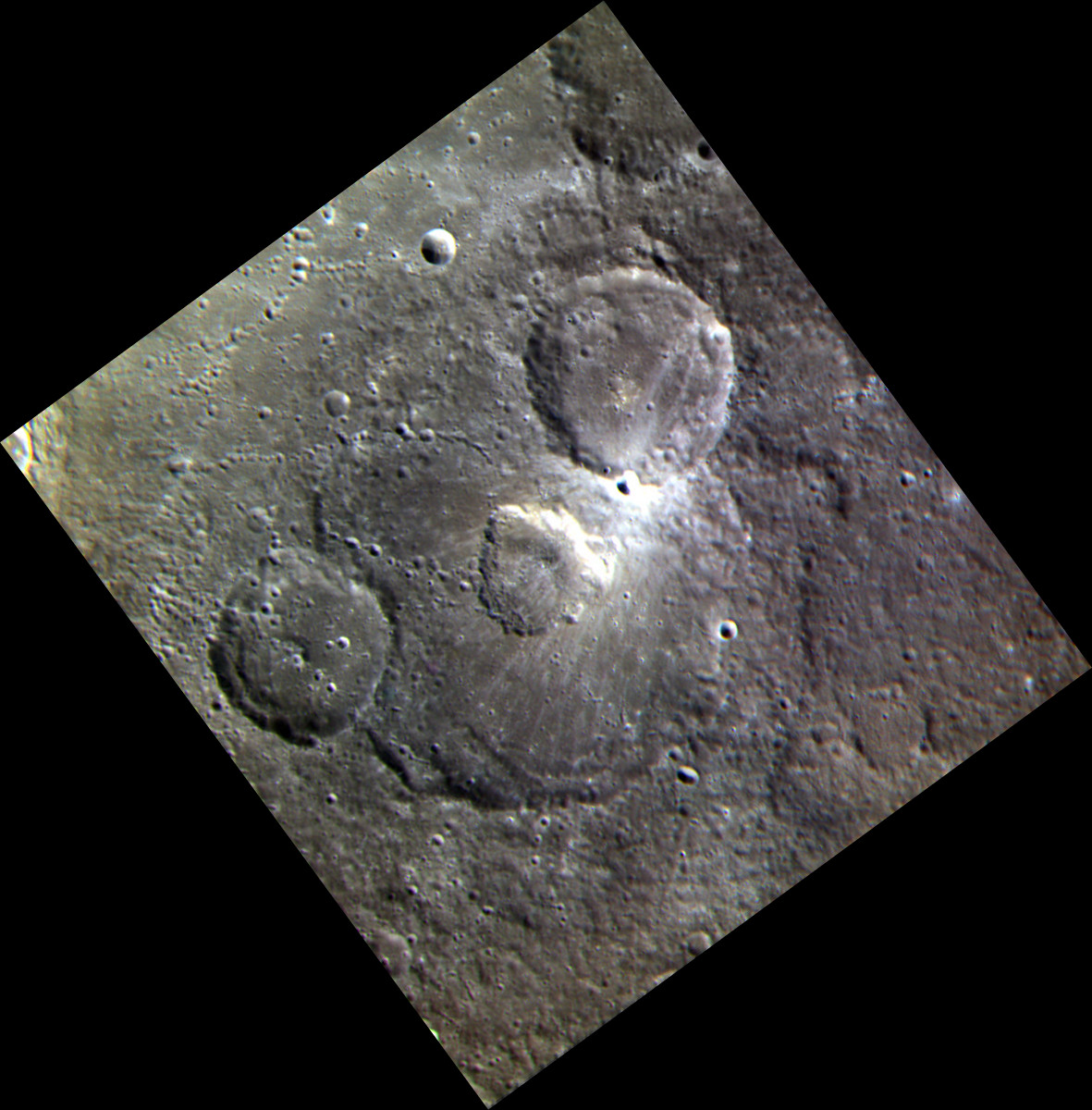
Approximate color image by MESSENGER
