= Beckett (crater) =

Crater on Mercury

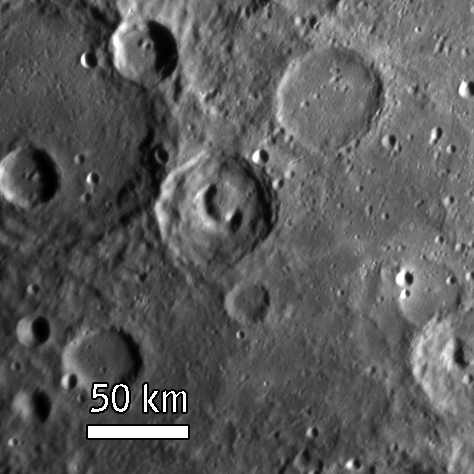
- MESSENGER mosaic
- Feature type: Impact crater
- Location: Neruda quadrangle, Mercury
- Coordinates: 40.20°S 248.71°W
- Diameter: 60.0 km (37.3 mi)
- Eponym: Clarice Beckett

Beckett is a pit-floored crater on Mercury, which was discovered in January 2008 during the first flyby of the planet by the MESSENGER spacecraft. The crater was named in November 2008 by the IAU, after Australian artist Clarice Beckett.

Its floor is not smooth and displays a telephone or arc-shaped collapse feature, which is also called a central pit. The size of the pit is 35 × 7.5 km. Such a feature may have resulted from the collapse of a magma chamber underlying the central part of the crater (see also Gibran, Glinka, and Picasso). The collapse feature is an analog of Earth's volcanic calderas. Beckett may be a site of explosive volcanism. The crater Grainger to the southwest of Beckett also shows signs of explosive volcanism.

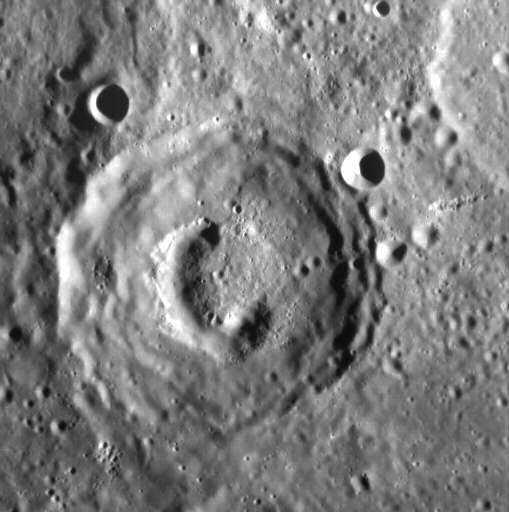
Another MESSENGER view

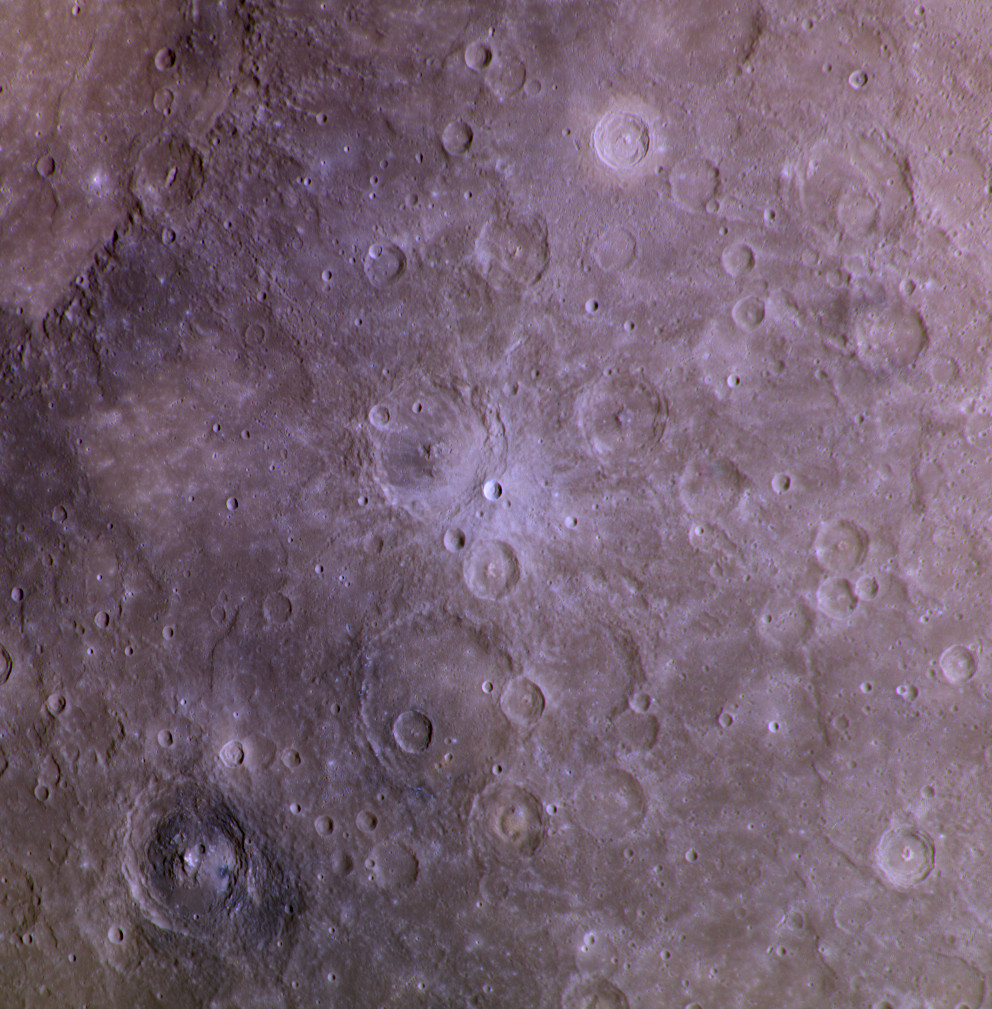
Slightly oblique exaggerated color view from MESSENGER, with Beckett below center. Note yellowish appearance around the irregular pit which may be a pyroclastic deposit.
