= Picasso (crater) =

Crater on Mercury

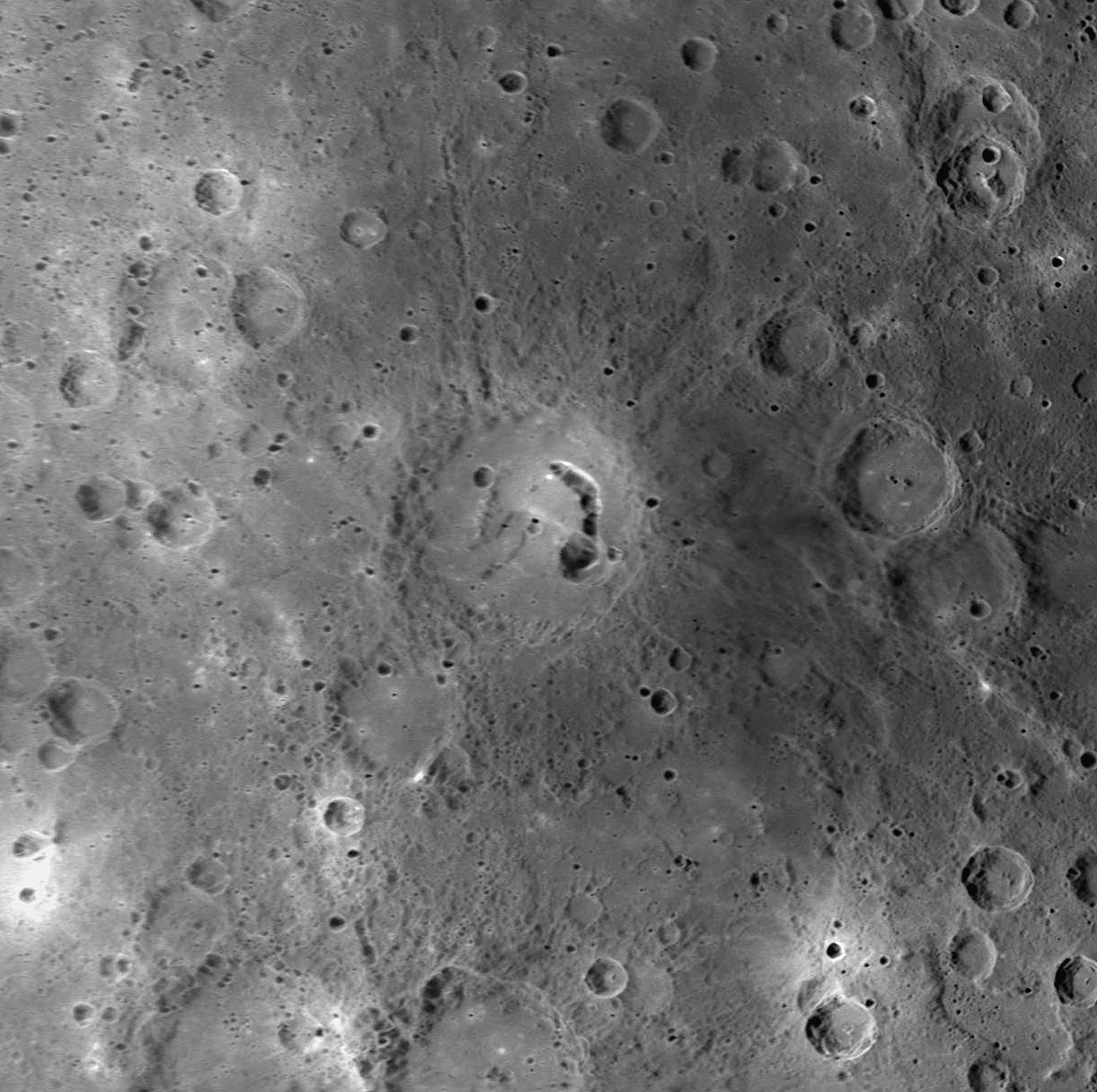
- MESSENGER image
- Feature type: Impact crater
- Location: Derain quadrangle, Mercury
- Coordinates: 3.44°N 309.76°W
- Diameter: 133 km (83 mi)
- Eponym: Pablo Picasso

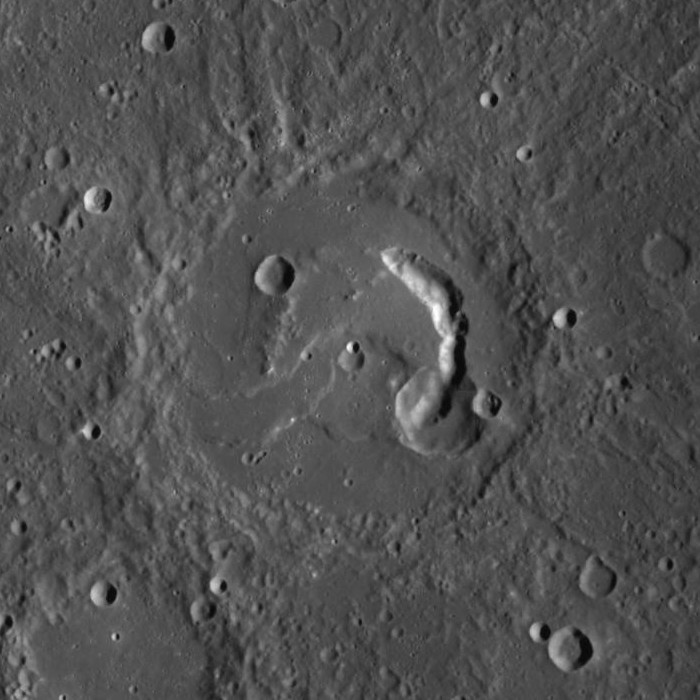
MESSENGER WAC mosaic

Picasso is a crater on Mercury. It has drawn scientific attention because of the large, arc-shaped pit crater located on the eastern side of its floor. Similar pits have been discovered on the floors of several other Mercury craters, such as Beckett, Glinka, and Gibran. These pits are postulated to have formed when subsurface magma subsided or drained, causing the surface to collapse into the resulting void. If this interpretation is correct, pit-floor craters such as Picasso provide evidence of shallow magmatic activity in Mercury's history.

The crater was named after the Spanish painter and modern artist Pablo Picasso by the IAU in 2010. The bright area surrounding the irregular pit was named Serp Facula by the IAU on 5 February 2025. Serp is the Catalan word for snake.

Picasso lies on the north rim of the ancient Lennon-Picasso Basin.
