= Grainger (crater) =

Crater on Mercury

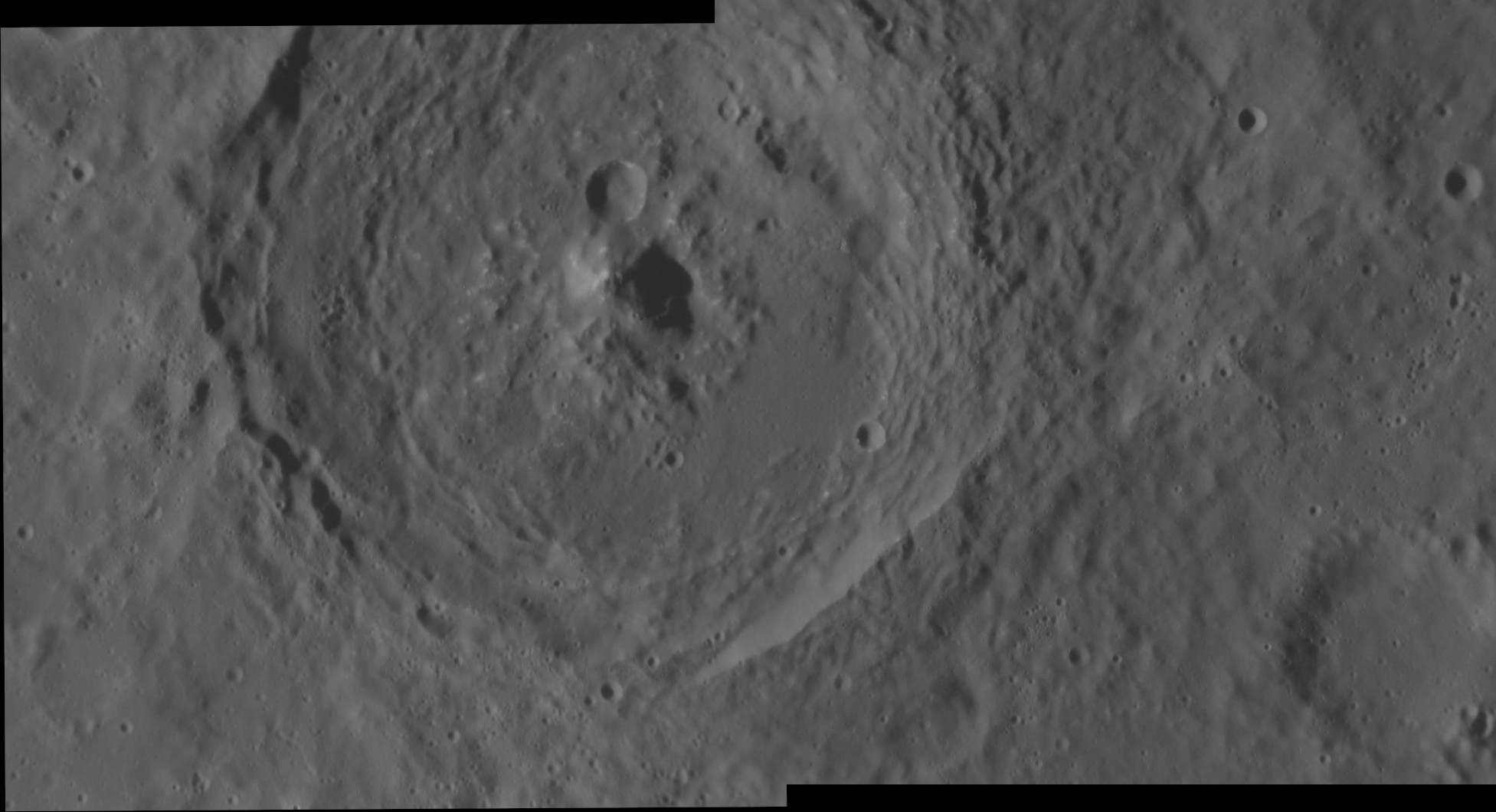
- MESSENGER mosaic
- Planet: Mercury
- Coordinates: 44.09°S 255.19°W
- Quadrangle: Neruda
- Diameter: 113 km (70 mi)
- Eponym: Percy Grainger

Grainger is a crater on Mercury. Its name was adopted by the International Astronomical Union (IAU) in 2012, after the Australian-born composer George Percy Aldridge Grainger.

Grainger has a rather prominent central peak, which rises above much of the rim of the crater. There is slumping evident around much of the outer rim.

There are irregular depressions with a halo of high-albedo material in the northeast quadrant of the crater, which may be volcanic in nature.

The large Rembrandt basin is to the northwest of Grainger, and to the northeast is Beckett crater.

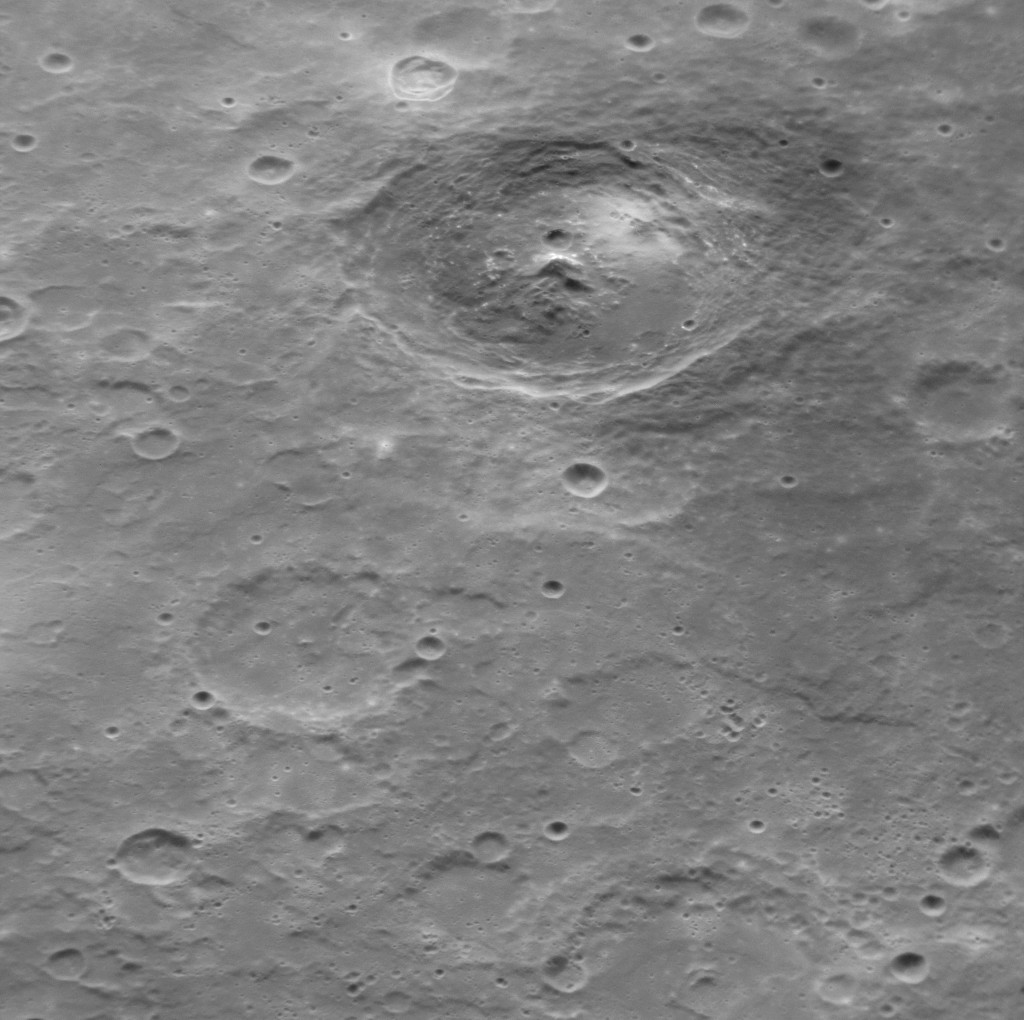
Oblique view from MESSENGER

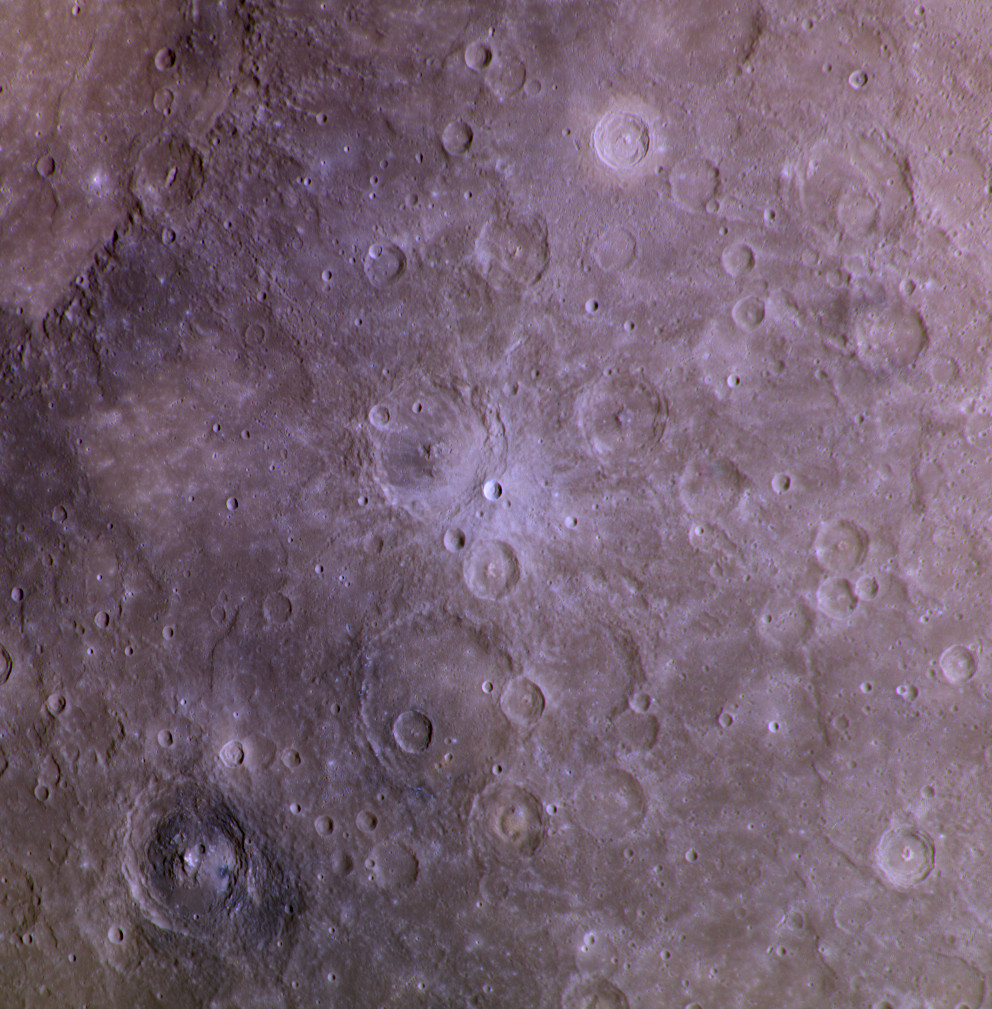
Slightly oblique exaggerated color view from MESSENGER, with Grainger in lower left
