= Clarice Beckett =

Australian artist (1887–1935)

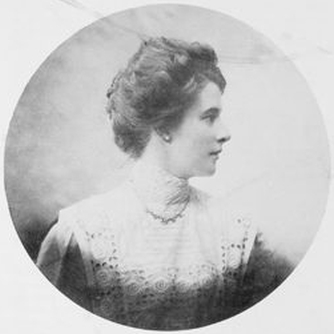
- Born: Clarice Marjoribanks Beckett; 21 March 1887; Casterton, Victoria, Australia
- Died: 7 July 1935 (aged 48); Melbourne, Victoria, Australia
- Known for: Painting
- Movement: Australian tonalism

Clarice Marjoribanks Beckett (21 March 1887 – 7 July 1935) was an Australian artist and a key member of the Australian tonalist movement. Known for her subtle, misty landscapes of Melbourne and its suburbs, Beckett developed a personal style that contributed to the development of modernism in Australia. Disregarded by the art establishment during her lifetime, and largely forgotten in the decades after her death, she is now considered one of Australia's greatest artists.

Born and raised in the country town of Casterton, Victoria, Beckett was seen as extremely shy from a young age, as well as bright and artistic. In 1914, after moving to Melbourne with her family, she began a three-year study at the National Gallery School under Australian impressionist painter Frederick McCubbin, then for nine months attended the rival school of art theorist Max Meldrum, a controversial outlier of the Australian art world who propounded his own tonalist painting system drawn from scientific principles. Beckett and others in Meldrum's circle, derided as "Meldrumites" by his critics, began staging group exhibitions in 1919. Beckett also exhibited with the Meldrum-inspired Twenty Melbourne Painters Society, and staged the first of her ten annual solo exhibitions in 1923.

Beckett never left Victoria and rarely travelled outside Melbourne, much of her adult life being spent caring for her ailing parents at their home in bayside Beaumaris. She did however paint prolifically, often en plein air in and around Beaumaris, and mostly at daybreak or towards evening, when she was exempted from domestic duties. In her method and choice of "everyday" subject matter, Beckett remained indebted to Meldrum, but her work also differed from that of other tonalists, in part due to its emotional and spiritual qualities, reflecting her interest in Buddhism, Theosophy and Freud. By 1926, she was creating landscapes unprecedented in Australian art for their "radical simplicity", and from 1930, she experimented further with a broader colour palette and more challenging compositions. In 1935, while painting the sea off Beaumaris during a winter storm, Beckett contracted pneumonia and died four days later, aged 48.

In what has been called "one of the great disasters of Australian art history", well over one thousand of Beckett's works were destroyed in the decades after her death, including many by her father that he deemed "unfinished"—works from her final years that were said by friends to be more abstracted and spiritual. More works were lost in a bush fire, and in 1970, in an open-sided shed in country Victoria, as many as two thousand works were found abandoned, two thirds of which had been destroyed by the elements. Those that did survive were exhibited the following year in Melbourne, precipitating a resurgence of interest in Beckett. Catalogues, biographies and major exhibitions followed, and today she is represented in Australia's national and state galleries.

== Life ==
=== Family and early years ===
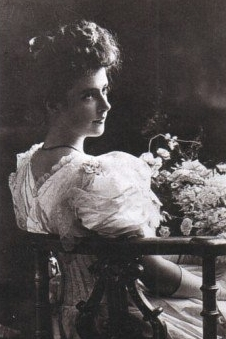
Beckett, aged 18

Beckett was born on 21 March 1887 in the town of Casteron in country Victoria, the eldest daughter of Elizabeth Kate (née Brown) and Joseph Clifden Beckett, a Freemason, organist and manager of the Casteron's Colonial Bank, the site of Clarice's birth. Beckett had one sister, Hilda. Their grandfather was John Brown, a Scottish master builder, who had designed and built Como House, and its gardens, in the Melbourne suburb of South Yarra.

Undertaking her primary education in Casterton, for secondary school Beckett was a boarder at Queen's College, Ballarat, until 1903, where she demonstrated strong drawing ability and wrote a play, including a part for herself, which was performed by the students, and in 1905 won a competition for writing on the moral lessons of Walter Melville's play A Girl's Cross Roads. To foster her artistic skill, she took private lessons in charcoal drawing in Ballarat. After her family's relocation to 22 Kensington Road, South Yarra, she finished her final year of school at the nearby Merton Hall campus of Melbourne Church of England Girls' Grammar School. The Beckett family then moved to Bendigo, where Beckett continued to pursue her art, and her and her sister's social engagements were reported on in the local press.

In 1914, Beckett and her sister moved back to Melbourne to attend the National Gallery School, where Clarice completed three years of study under Frederick McCubbin, one of the leading figures of Heidelberg School of Australian impressionism.

=== Meldrum and Australian tonalism ===
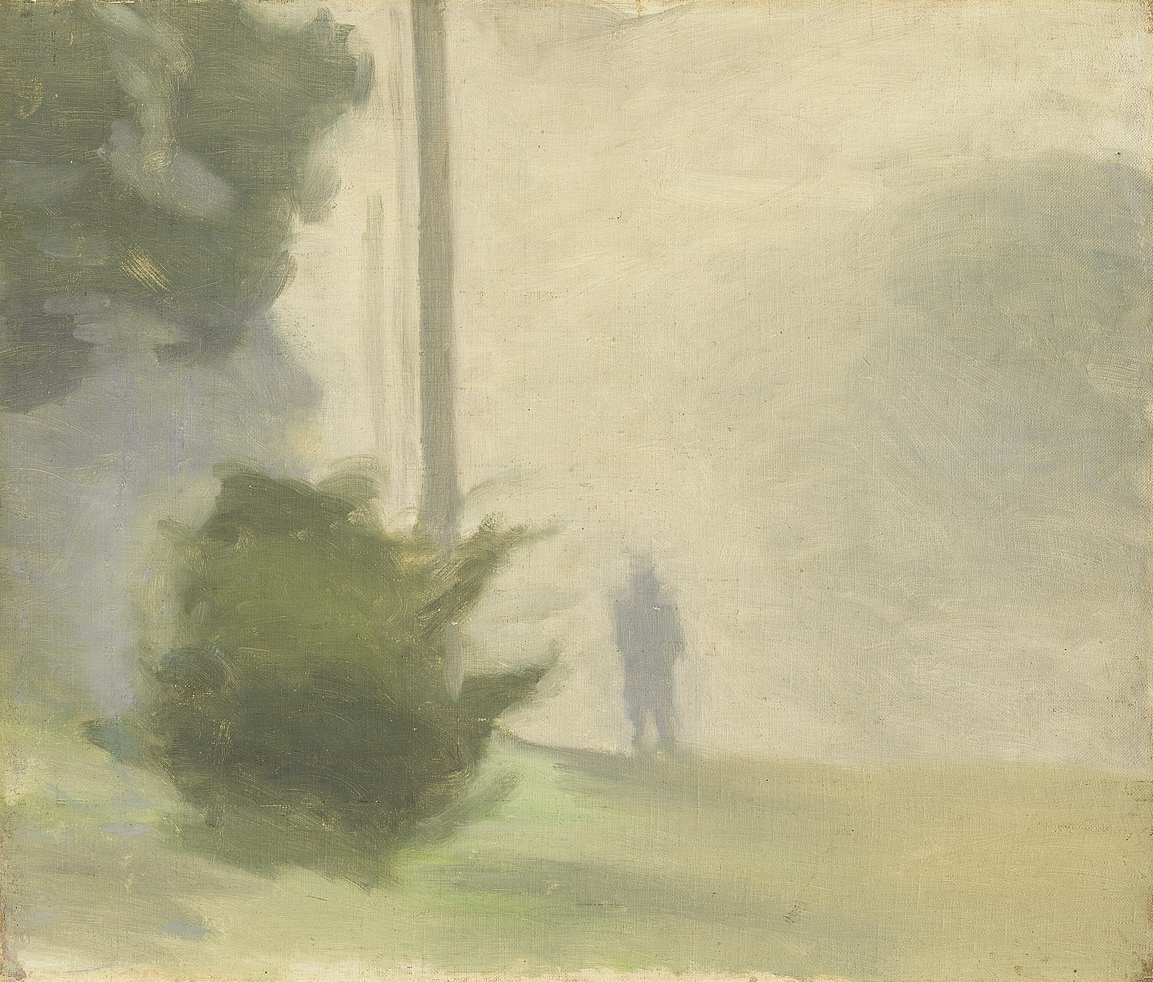
Silent Approach, c. 1924

In 1919, Beckett became the first National Gallery student to break from the school and study under rival teacher Max Meldrum, whose controversial theories became a pivotal factor in her own art practice. Beckett had met Meldrum as early as 1906, when, through the friendship of Beatrix Hoile and her husband Alexander Colquhoun, she became associated with an artistic circle that he frequented. She studied under Meldrum for nine months, adopting aspects of his unique tonalist system of painting, the "Scientific Order of Impressions", which resulted in a style now known as Australian tonalism, characterised by a particular "misty" or atmospheric quality created by building "tone on tone". Meldrum maintained that art "should be a pure science based on optical analysis; its sole purpose being to place on the canvas the first ordered tonal impressions that the eye received. All adornments and narrative and literary references should be rejected".

The Australian tonalists opposed impressionism and modernist art styles, and for decades the movement was the subject of fierce controversy. Its practitioners were unpopular amongst other artists, and derided as "Meldrumites". Influential Melbourne modernist artist and teacher George Bell, founder of the Contemporary Art Society, described Australian Tonalism as a "cult which muffles everything in a pall of opaque density".

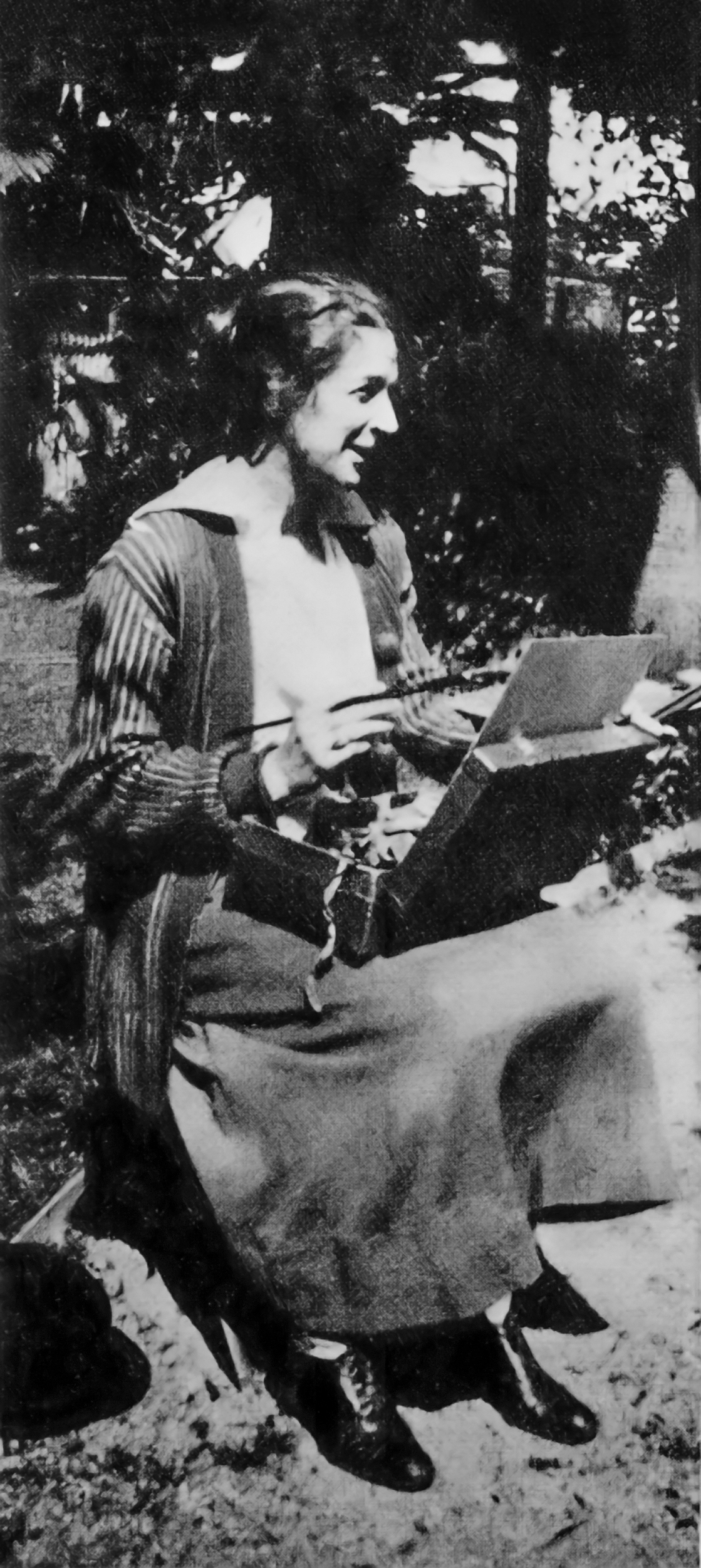
Beckett painting en plein air at St Enoch's, Beaumaris, c.1920s

In 1919 the Beckett family moved from Bendigo to Melbourne's then-undeveloped bayside suburb of Beaumaris, into an existing dwelling on a double block at 14 Dalgetty Road on the corner of Tramway Parade, which they named St. Enoch's after their Bendigo home.

With her parents' health failing, and after her sister's marriage in 1922, Beckett assumed household responsibilities that dictated the structure of the rest of her life, limiting her artistic endeavours. She did however regularly exhibit with other Australian tonalists at the Melbourne Athenaeum, and also with the Meldrum-inspired Twenty Melbourne Painters Society. She also joined painting and camping excursions with groups of other Australian tonalists, including the artists Lily and Justus Jorgensen, Percy Leason and Colin Colahan and their families into the hills of Eltham, Olinda, and to Anglesea (c. 1929), Lorne and San Remo (c. 1930s) on the coast, as her paintings of these locations attest, and she often met with them at the Café Latin in Exhibition Street, Melbourne.

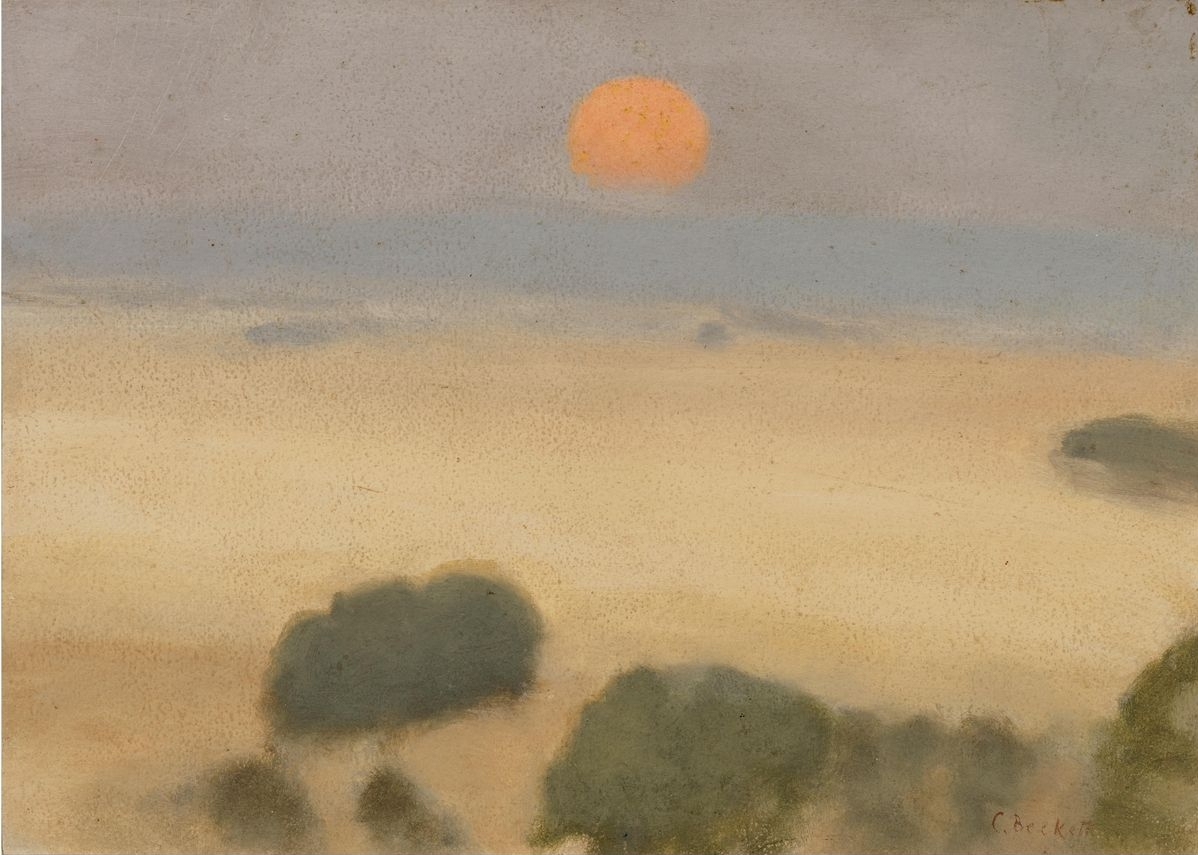
Summer Fields, 1926, painted during her stay at Naringal

In 1926, Beckett painted during a six-month sojourn in Victoria's Western District using as a studio the upper level of a shearing shed at the Naringal property of the brother of her good friend, Maud Rowe. At home in Beaumaris, Beckett could only go out during the dawn and dusk to paint as most of her day was spent caring for her parents, more intensively from 1932 when her mother became seriously ill, before dying in 1934.

Nevertheless, poet C. J. Dennis, writing as 'The Rousabout' in The Herald (1932) found in her paintings, which included prosaic modern features, a novel interpretation:

I am indebted to Miss Beckett for a sharp lesson. There are bathing boxes in Beaumaris beach the sight of which I shunned unless nymphs happened to be guarding the doorways; petrol pumps on the road which inspired only a thought of the price of the juice they contained; telegraph poles put there, apparently, just to annoy artists. But she has courageously brought the boxes, pumps, and poles, as well as motor cars into the picture, and lo! we see that the sun loves to play about them. So I really saw Beaumaris for the first time.

Beckett's father, though becoming frail, moved from Beaumaris, after burning her paintings he considered were 'unfinished,' and died 12 June 1936 in St Kilda, leaving an estate of £2520 to Hilda.

=== Death ===
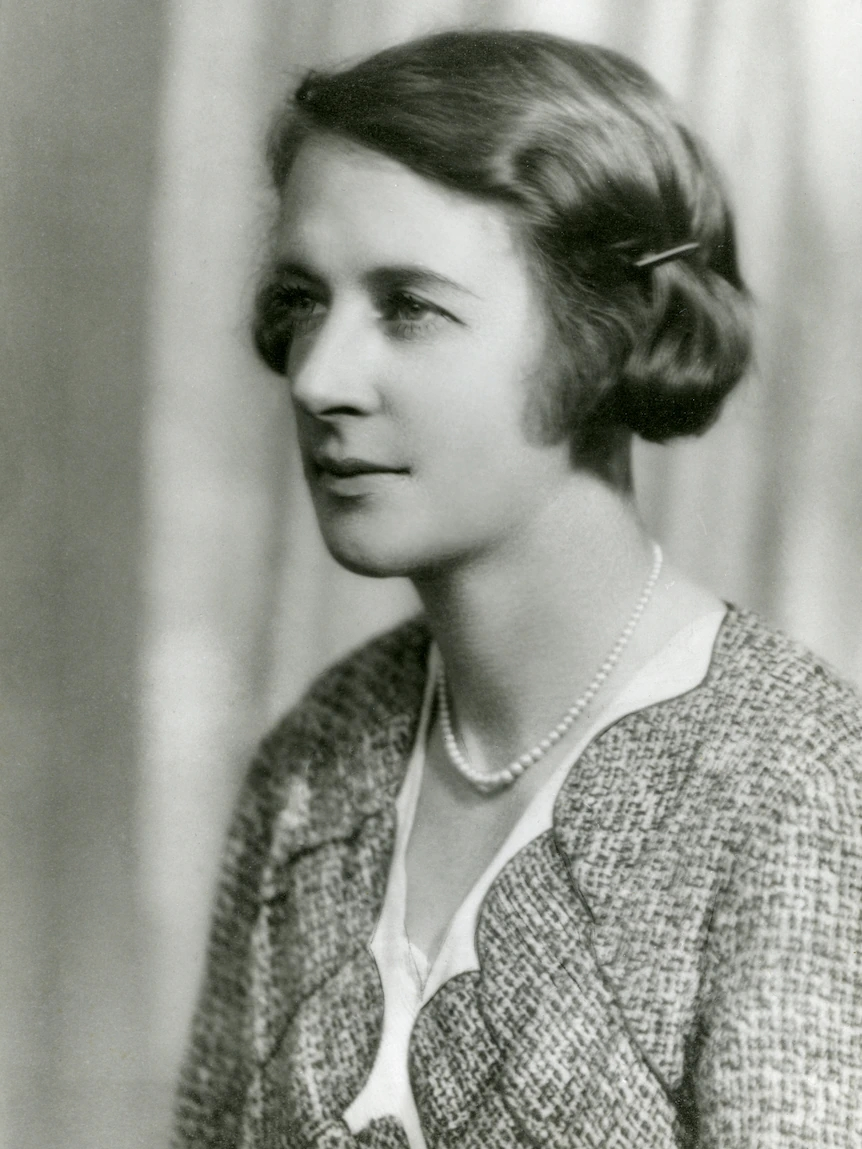
Clarice Beckett, c.1931, unknown photographer

While painting the sea off Beaumaris during a storm in 1935, Beckett developed pneumonia and died four days later, aged 48, in a hospital at Sandringham. She was buried in the Cheltenham Memorial Park. A retrospective solo exhibition of Beckett's work was held at the Melbourne Athenaeum. Attending the opening, Meldrum, despite expressing the opinion elsewhere that "There would never be a great woman artist", described Beckett as his most skilled pupil, saying that "she worked like a man", that she had done work "of which any nation would be proud", of whom "no European critic would say that [she] belonged to any particular school and that would be the highest compliment one could bestow. She ranked as a great artist."

== Style and subject matter ==
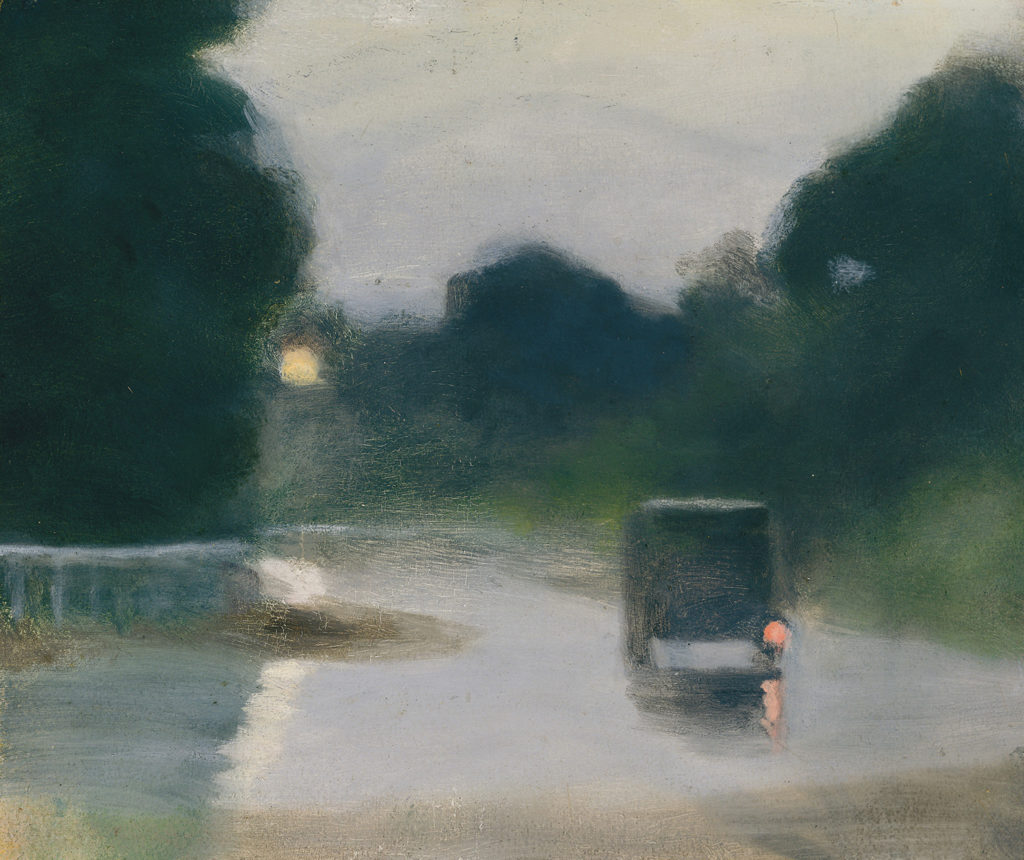
Wet Evening, 1927

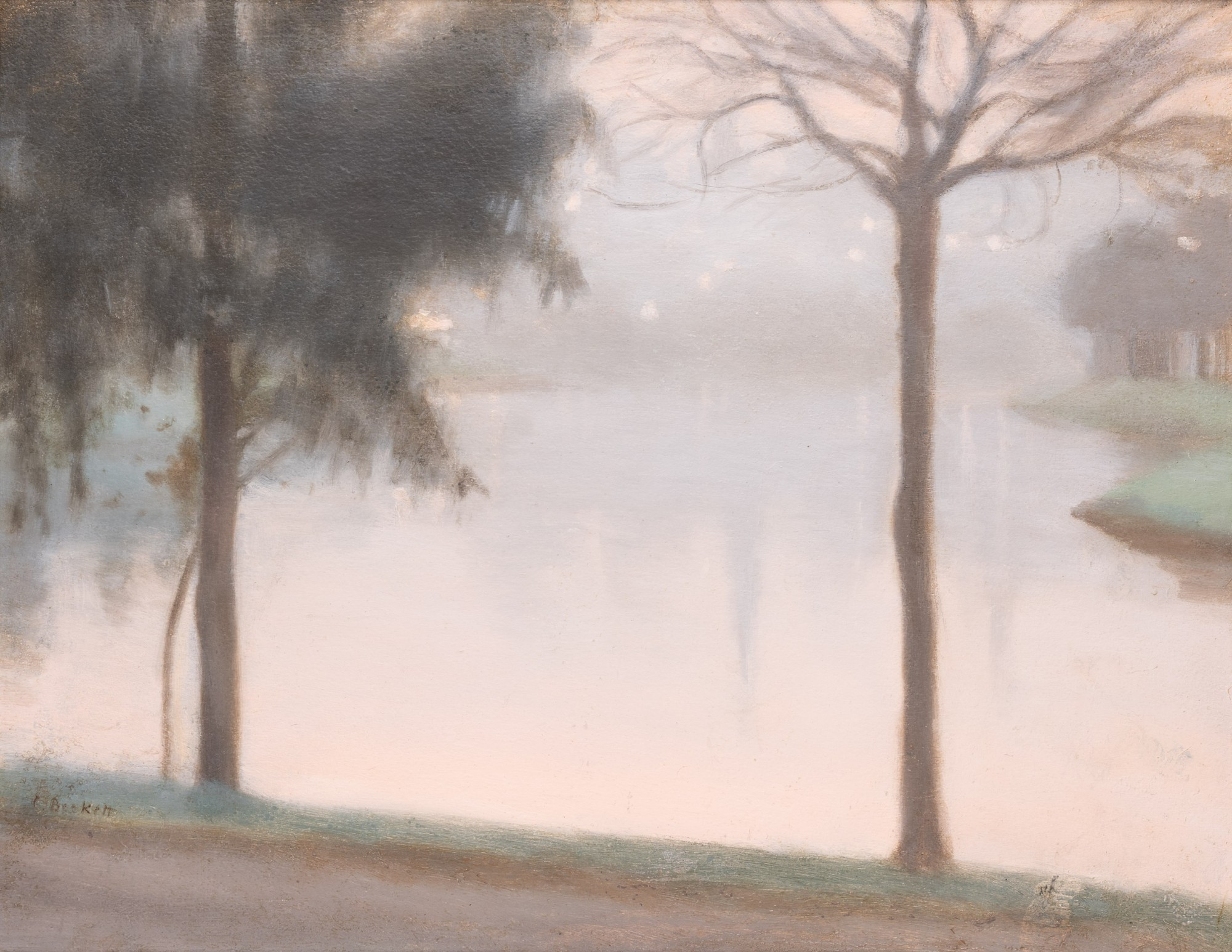
View Across the Yarra, c. 1931

Beckett elucidated her artistic aims in what is her only known surviving written statement, published in the catalogue accompanying the sixth annual exhibition of the Twenty Melbourne Painters Society, held in 1924:

To give a sincere and truthful representation of a portion of the beauty of Nature, and to show the charm of light and shade, which I try to give forth in correct tones so as to give as nearly as possible an exact illusion of reality.

Beckett persistently and diligently painted, extending Meldrum's principles to subjects en plein air, and was highly productive. Her subjects were sea and beachscapes, and rural and suburban scenes, often enveloped in the atmospheric effects of early mornings or evening. Early critical appraisal of her paintings was mixed, with members of the conservative art establishment often finding fault in their "opaque" quality. Many critics found her difficult to categorise. Surveying her work in 1931, a critic for The Age recalled that, "When Miss Clarice Beckett held her first show at the Athenæum gallery in 1923 her work certainly found admirers, but the admiration was by no means general, and there was a good deal of confusion in the public mind as to whether she was a futurist, or only a new and dangerous variety of Meldrumite." Reviewing one of her shows, an earlier critic from The Age wrote that "one would imagine from the little scenes that Miss Beckett has gathered, in the name of Australian art, that Australia was in a continual state of fog—all kinds of fogs—pink, blue, green and grey with an occasional mist that surely was never on land or sea."

In 1925, Herald reviewer and staunch anti-modernist James S. MacDonald was especially derogatory, favouring, if anything, the flower studies that Beckett regarded as minor in comparison with her landscapes. By 1931, however, her friend and fellow Australian tonalist Percy Leason, writing a long review in Table Talk, said that Beckett's work showed "a convincing illusion of actual space and air and light; the same refinement and delicacy of true color; the same regard for true form and character; and the same complete indifference to conventions and the mere clever handling of paint for the sake of it."

Despite a talent for portraiture and a keen public appreciation for her still lifes, the subject matter favoured by her teacher Meldrum, Beckett preferred the solo, outdoor process of painting landscapes. Her subjects were often drawn from the Beaumaris area, where she lived for the latter part of her life. She was one of the first of Meldrum's group to use a painting trolley, or mobile easel to make it easier to paint outdoors in different locations.

=== Modernism and increasing abstraction ===
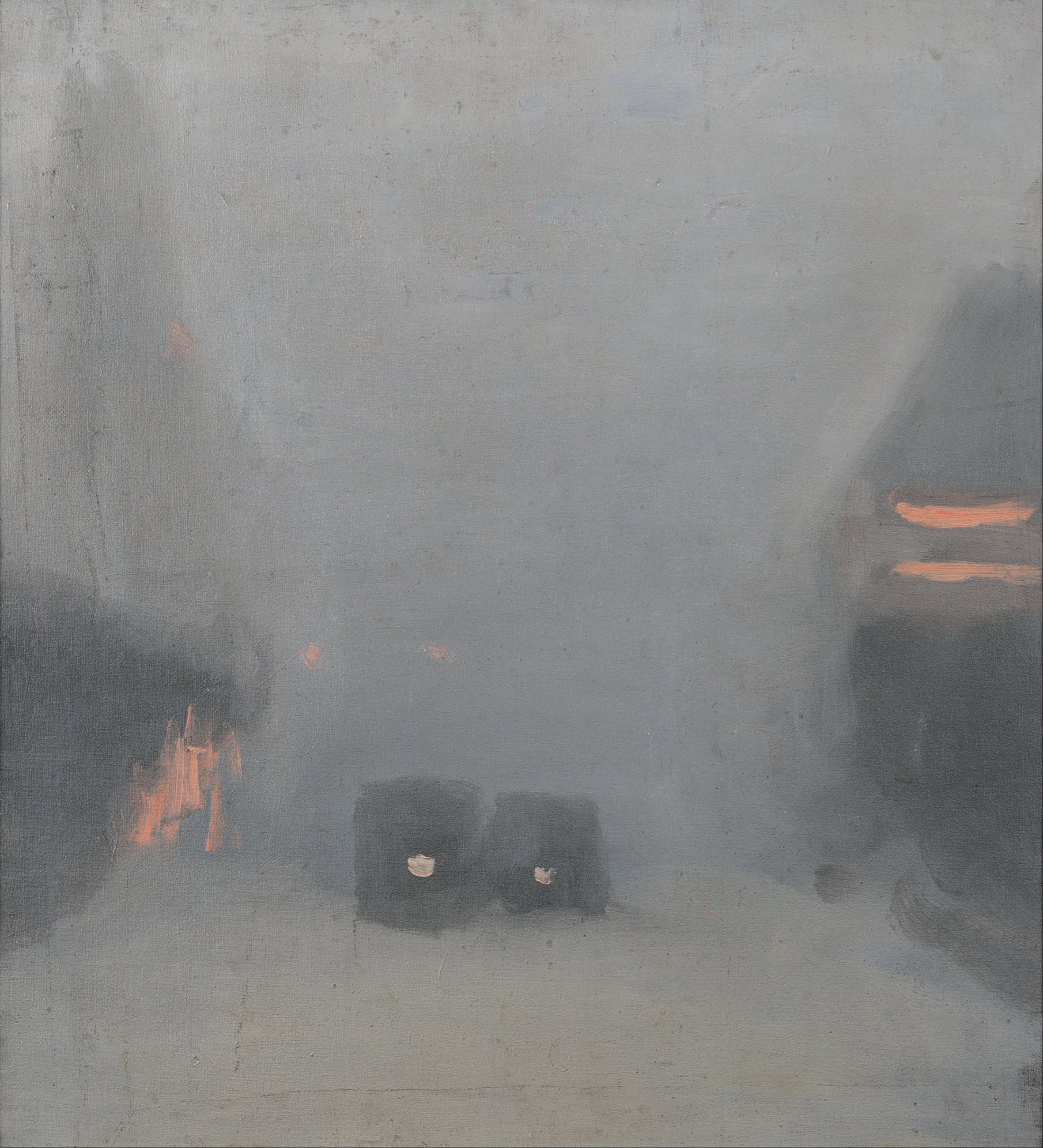
Passing Trams, 1931

As Beckett developed her own style, she departed from Meldrum's dictum that tone should take precedence over colour. While Meldrum blamed social decadence for 'modern' artists' exaggerated interest in colour over tone and proportion, an uncredited Age reviewer of her 1932 Atheneum show expressed her particular version of his principles as being "an adaptation of art to nature, which belongs neither to the realm of the orthodox normalist or the avowed modern, but is a purely individual expression of certain sensations in light, form and color."

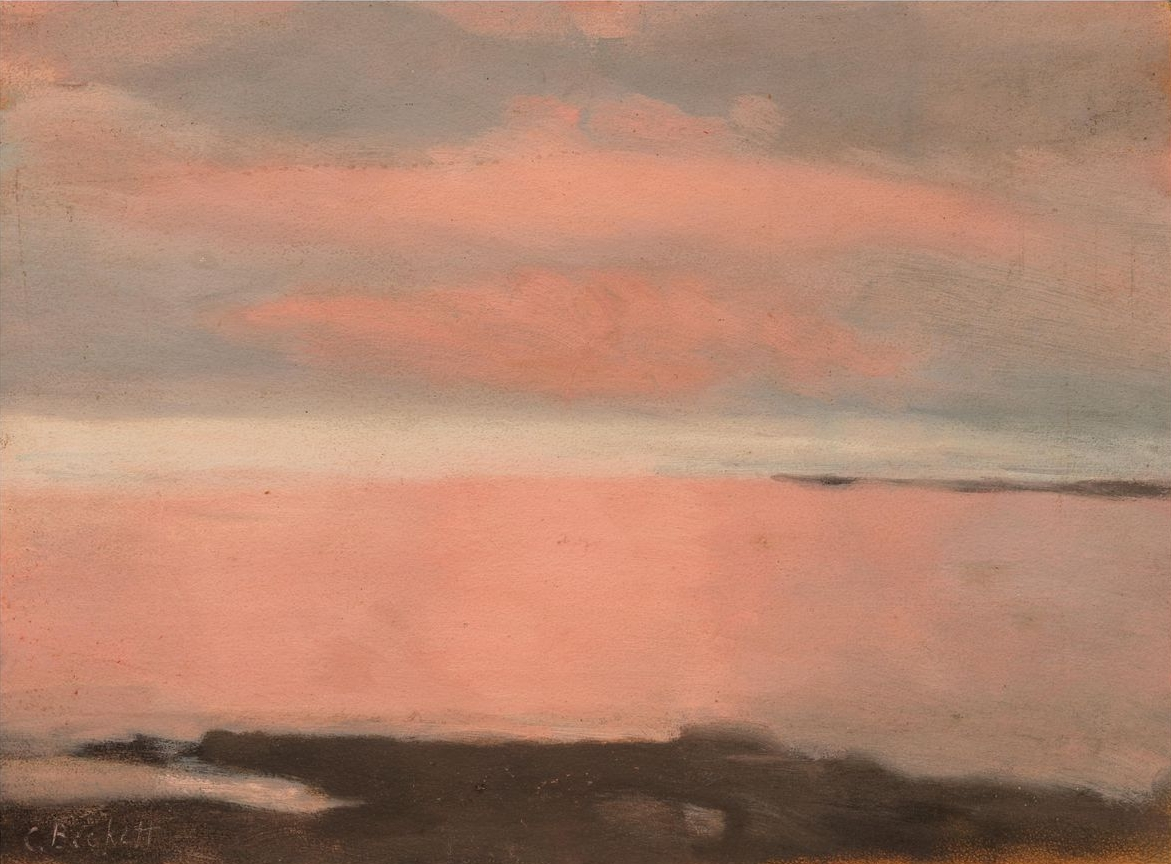
Sunset, 1932

Rosalind Hollinrake, who was largely responsible for Beckett's revival in 1970, notes a use of colour to reinforce form, and more daring design, in the later years of the artist's short life. In 1971 The Age critic Patrick McCaughey considered Beckett "a remarkable modernist," situating her as an equal to Grace Cossington Smith and Margaret Preston, and "both a Meldrumite and a pioneering modernist."

Artist and critic Nancy Borlase writing on the occasion of Beckett's 1979 Macquarie Galleries retrospective that launched Hollinrake's Clarice Beckett-The Artist and Her Circle draws attention to Beckett's reductionism that "presage the work of Barnett Newman and [Jules] Olitski," of forty years later, and "solitude and stillness" as her leitmotif.

In 2001, Tim Bonyhady, discussing the Modern Australian Women exhibition in which Beckett was included at the Art Gallery of South Australia, acknowledges its director Ron Radford's observation that women artists Margaret Preston, Clarice Beckett, Grace Cossington Smith, Grace Crowley, Dorrit Black and Kathleen O'Connor were "more adventurous than their male counterparts in what and how they painted," but baulks at his notion that they were "the major Australian artists of the 1920s and 1930s."

== Legacy ==
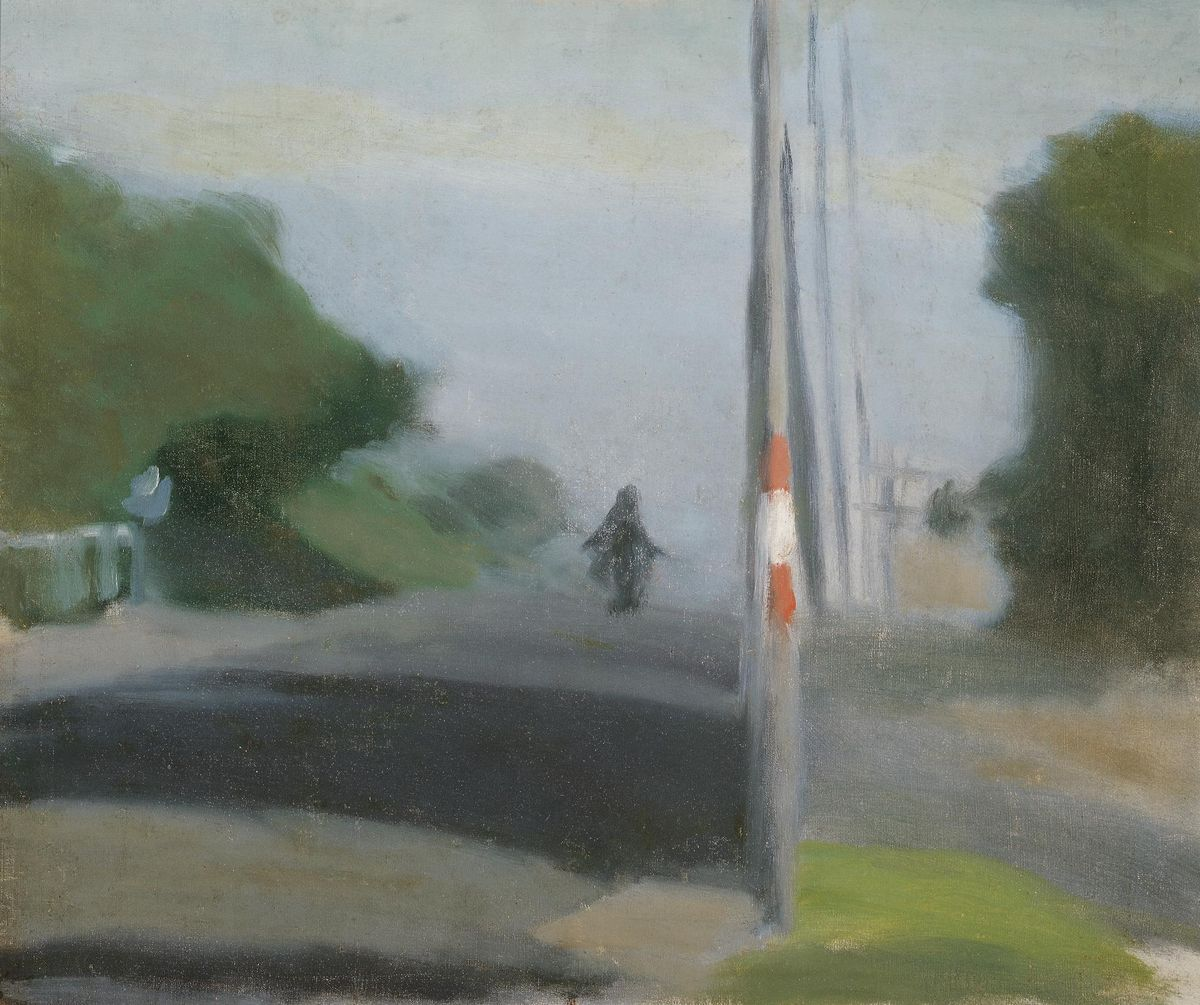
Morning Shadows (c. 1932) was acquired by the Art Gallery of South Australia in 1979, making it the first of Beckett's works to enter the collection. The painting was the subject of a two-hour lecture by Germaine Greer, who said Beckett was "the first to paint the suburbs of Australia ... Australia as it really is, as we know it."

In 1936, a major memorial exhibition of 79 works was presented over 4–16 May at the Melbourne Athenaeum by Beckett's sister and father, with prices ranging from 75 guineas (a value of A$7,228.00 in 2022) for Along the Coast, with most at 10–40, to 3 guineas each for 'ten sketches.' An unnamed reviewer for The Age reviewed the show reverently, quoted Meldrum's comment that she "had done work of which any nation should be proud," and concluded that;

No European critic would say that Miss Beckett belonged to any particular school, and that would be the highest compliment one could bestow. She ranked as a great artist.

During her lifetime, Beckett was not represented in any public collection in Australia, though her sister donated one work and friend Maud Rowe bequeathed three to the Castlemaine Art Museum shortly after her death, with others going to the Art Gallery of Ballarat in 1937; now almost every major Australian gallery holds examples of her work, including the National Gallery of Australia, which purchased eight of her works on the recommendation of artist Fred Williams in 1971. Williams wrote on Beckett:

She really was ahead of her time. I found it very interesting to compare her early best work with Blackman's early paintings, that same lyrical feeling ...

In 1971, Beckett's sister alerted Hollinrake to a tragedy; more than 2,000 of her works had been left abandoned to the elements and vermin in an open-sided hay shed near Benalla. Most were unsalvageable, but thirty well-preserved but neglected works were discovered at the Montsalvat artist colony, sent there when the Beaumaris home was cleared. An image of at least one of the lost works survives (see external links below).

Five commercial gallery exhibitions of Beckett's work were staged from 1971 to 1980. The first museum exhibition of her work, In a Certain Light (a two-person show with photographer Olive Cotton) was curated by Felicity Fenner and artist Jenny Bell for UNSW's Ivan Dougherty Gallery in 1995. Over 1999 and 2000, the retrospective exhibition Politically incorrect: Clarice Beckett was organised by the Ian Potter Museum of Art, University of Melbourne, and Rosalind Hollinrake. It toured eight national galleries. By 2001, her paintings had achieved six figure sums at auction.

During the 2021 Adelaide Festival, the Art Gallery of South Australia staged the exhibition "Clarice Beckett: The Present Moment". Her most comprehensive retrospective to date, it featured 160 works, including a long-lost portrait that had recently been rediscovered. It drew large crowds and was the most successful ticketed solo exhibition in the museum's 140-year history. Between April and July 2023, Geelong Art Gallery staged the retrospective "Clarice Beckett—Atmosphere".

She is memorialised in Clarice Beckett's Lane in the Melbourne suburb of Black Rock, and in the naming of Beckett Ward, one of seven City of Bayside municipal wards. Ballarat Grammar, where the artist studied, awards the Clarice Beckett Prize annually to a student for outstanding achievement in the study of Art at VCE level. She is also the eponym of Beckett, a crater on the planet Mercury, discovered in 2008 and named by the International Astronomical Union.

== Cultural references ==
Kristel Thornell's debut novel Night Street (2009) is a fictionalised account of Beckett's life. It co-won The Australian/Vogel Literary Award, and won the Dobbie Literary Award. Nobel laureate Patrick White referred to Beckett's work when discussing influences on his 1979 novel The Twyborn Affair, which has been described as vivid and painterly in its representation of landscape.

A number of Beckett's paintings feature as a plot point in the 2022 film Poker Face, directed by and starring Russell Crowe. An avid collector of Beckett's work, Crowe used real Beckett paintings from his personal collection, as well as some from the Art Gallery of New South Wales.

== Selected paintings ==
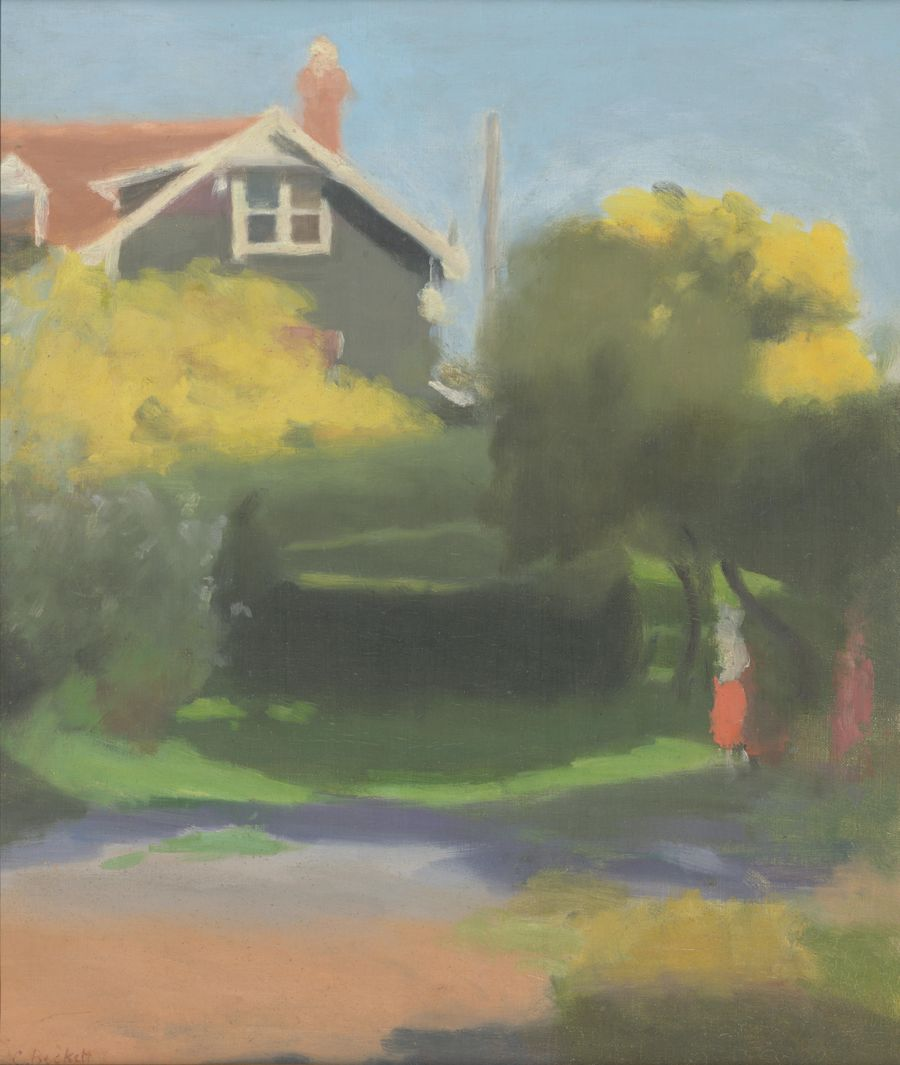
Spring Morning, 1925, Benalla Art Gallery

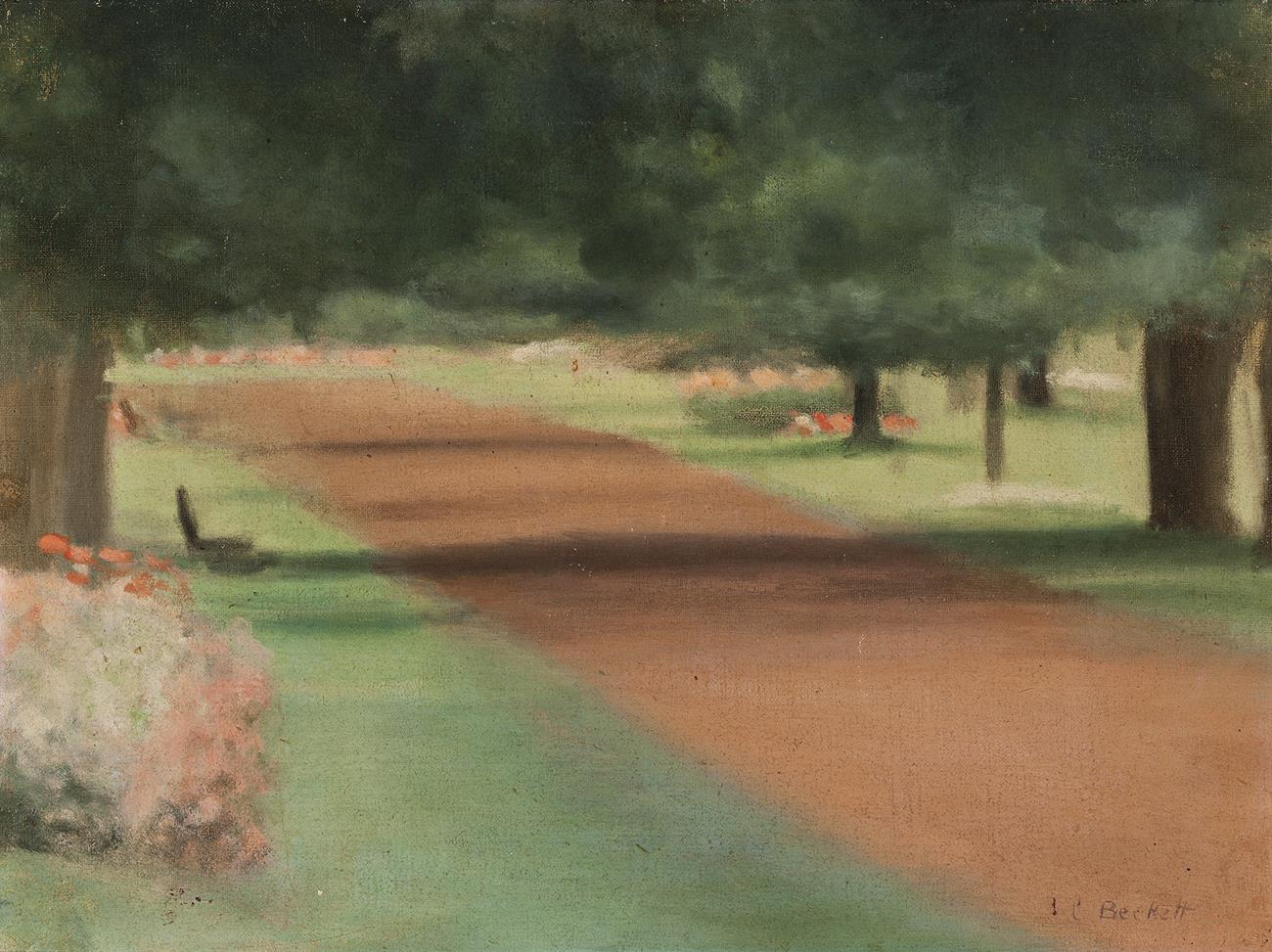
Chestnut Avenue, Ballarat Gardens, 1927, private collection

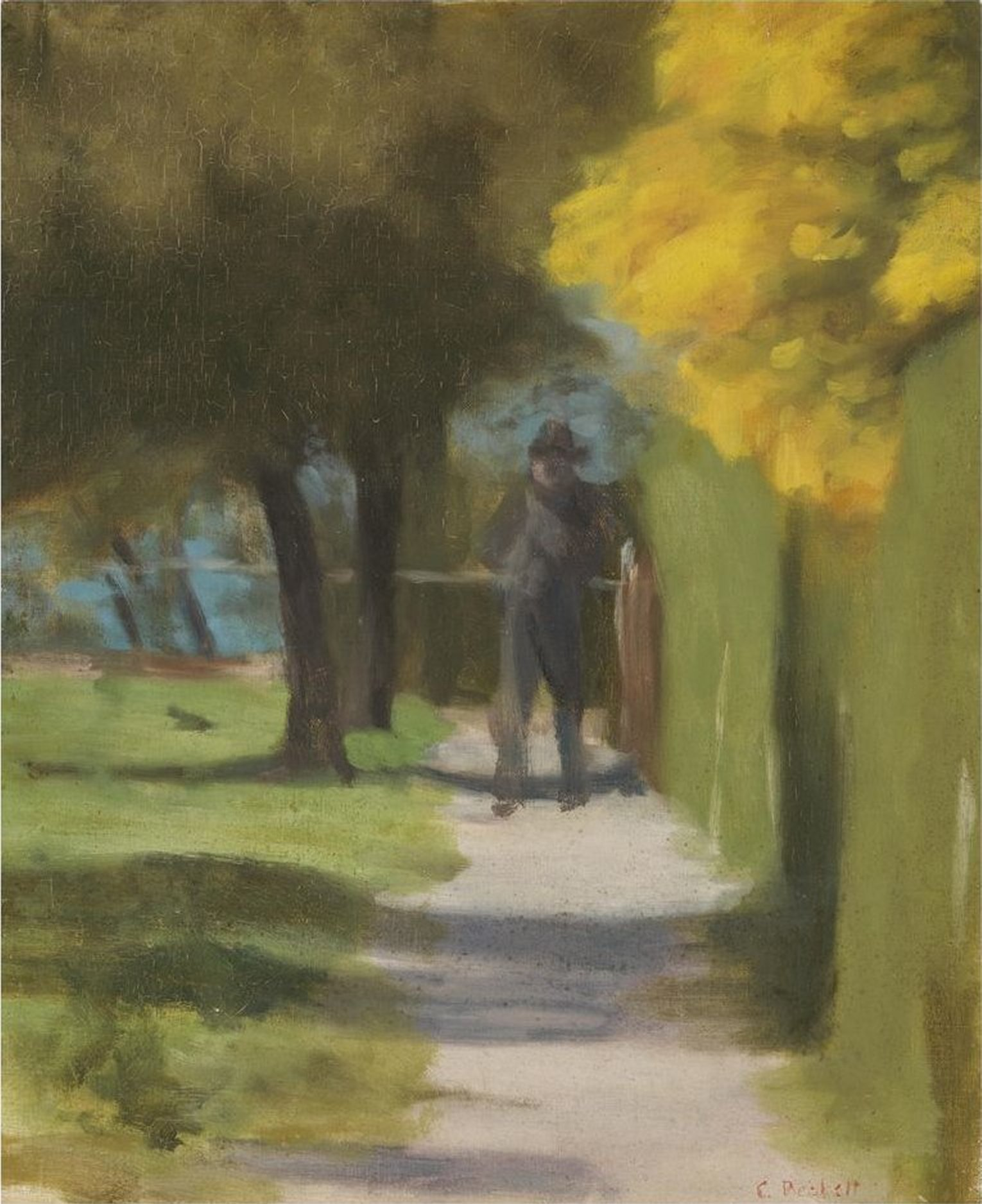
October Morning, 1927, Art Gallery of South Australia

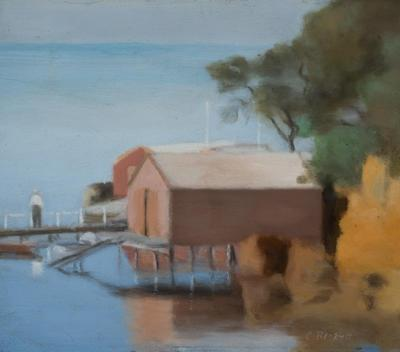
Boatshed Beaumaris, 1928, Castlemaine Art Museum

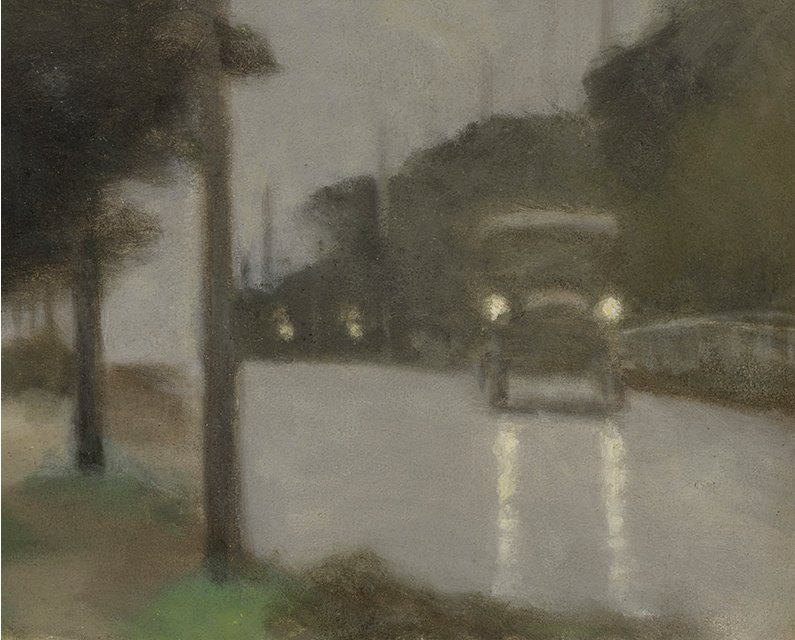
Motor Lights, 1929, Art Gallery of South Australia

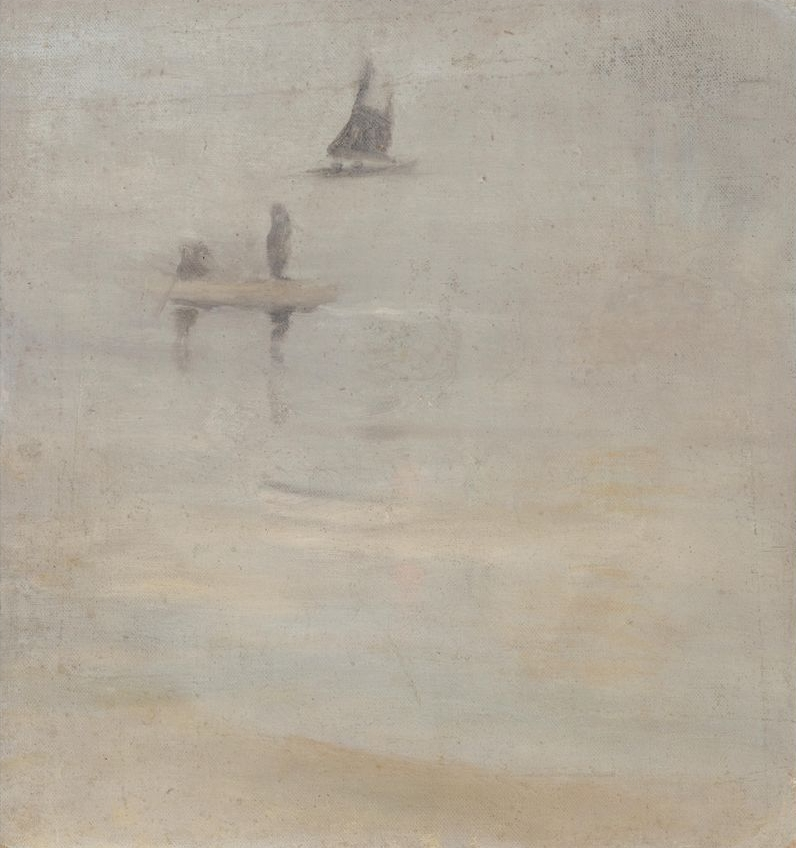
Sea Drift, 1930, Art Gallery of South Australia

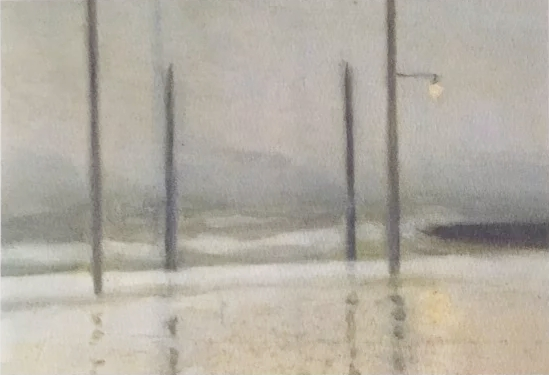
Wet Night, Brighton, 1930, private collection

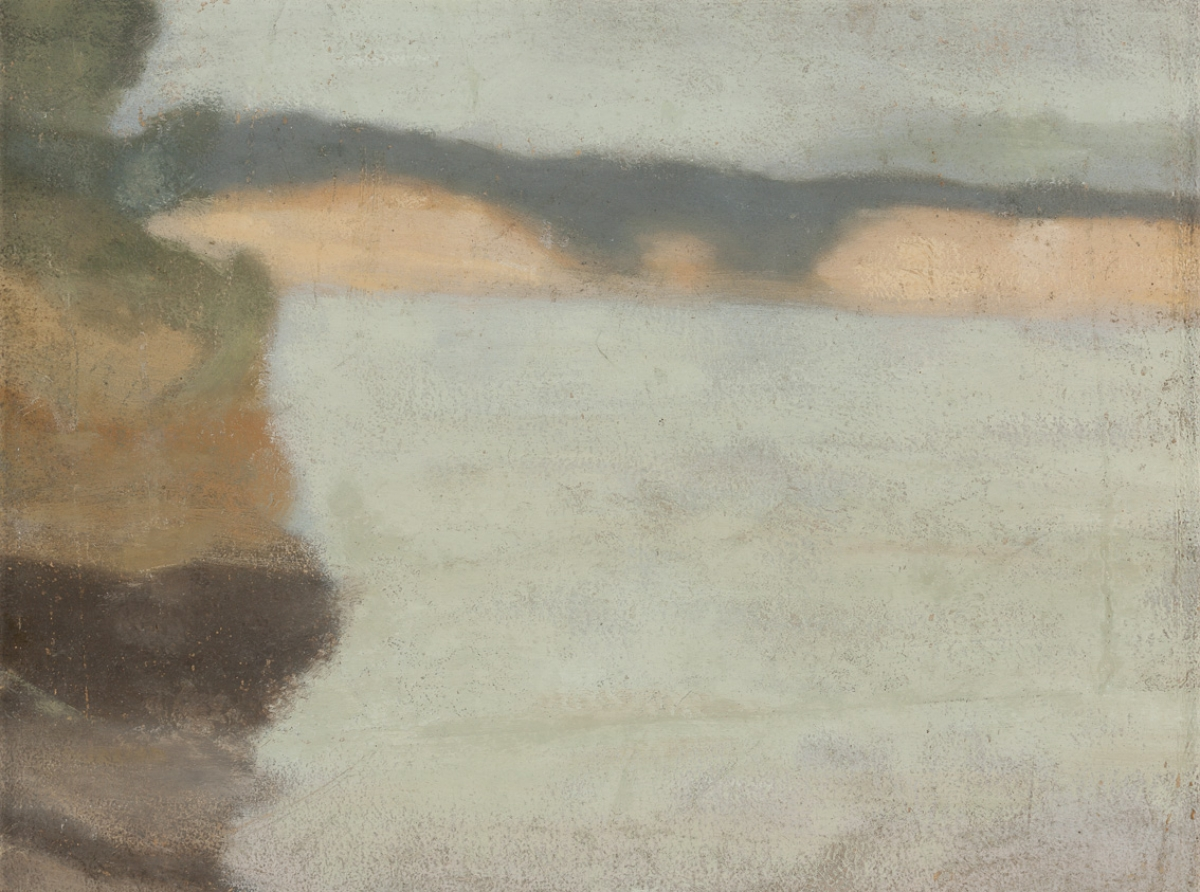
Half Moon Bay, 1930, private collection

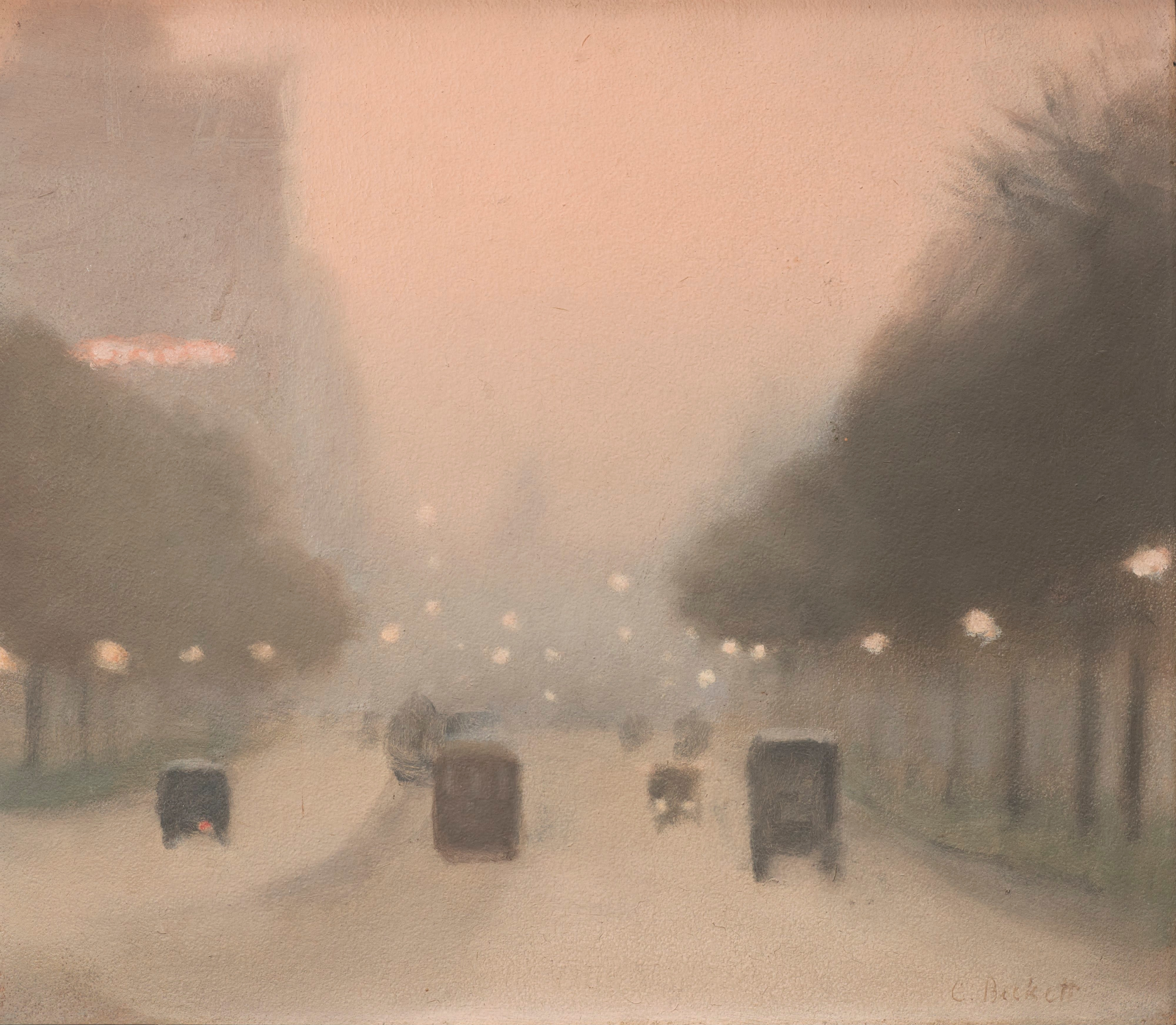
Evening, St Kilda Road, 1930, Art Gallery of New South Wales

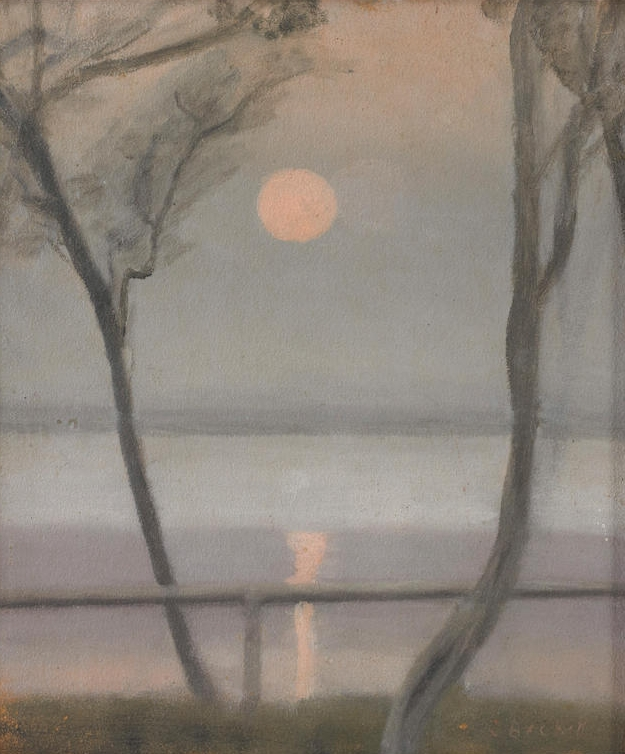
Moonlight and Calm Sea, 1931, private collection

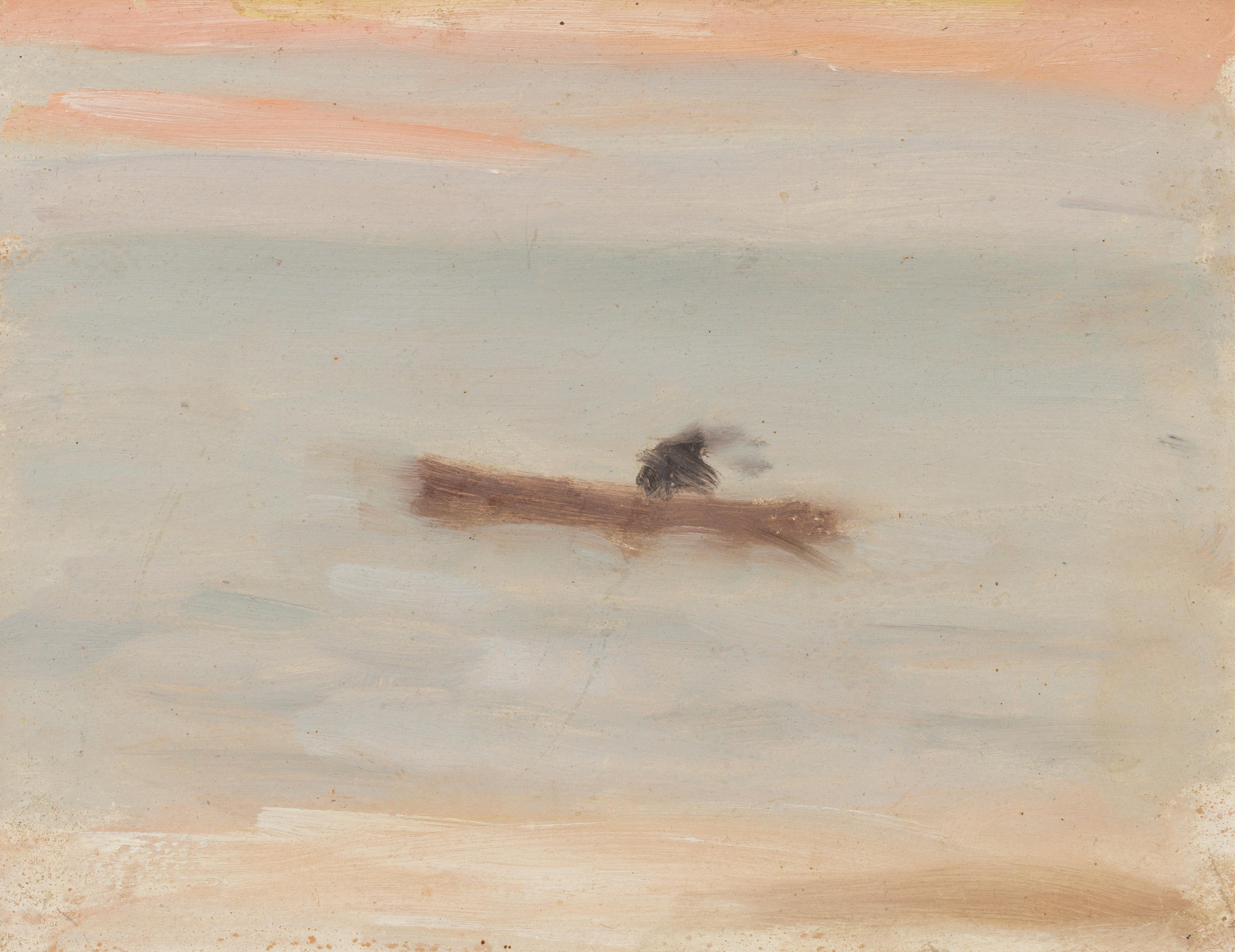
Solitude, 1932, Art Gallery of South Australia

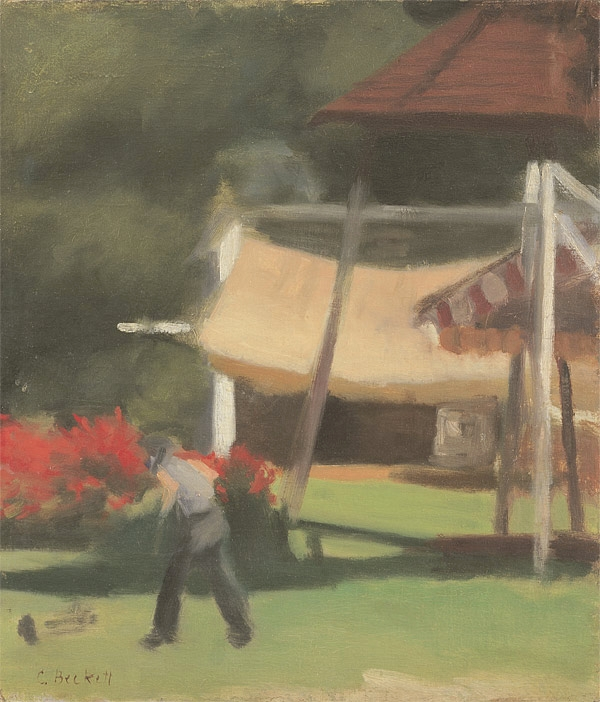
Hawthorn Tea Gardens, 1933, Art Gallery of South Australia

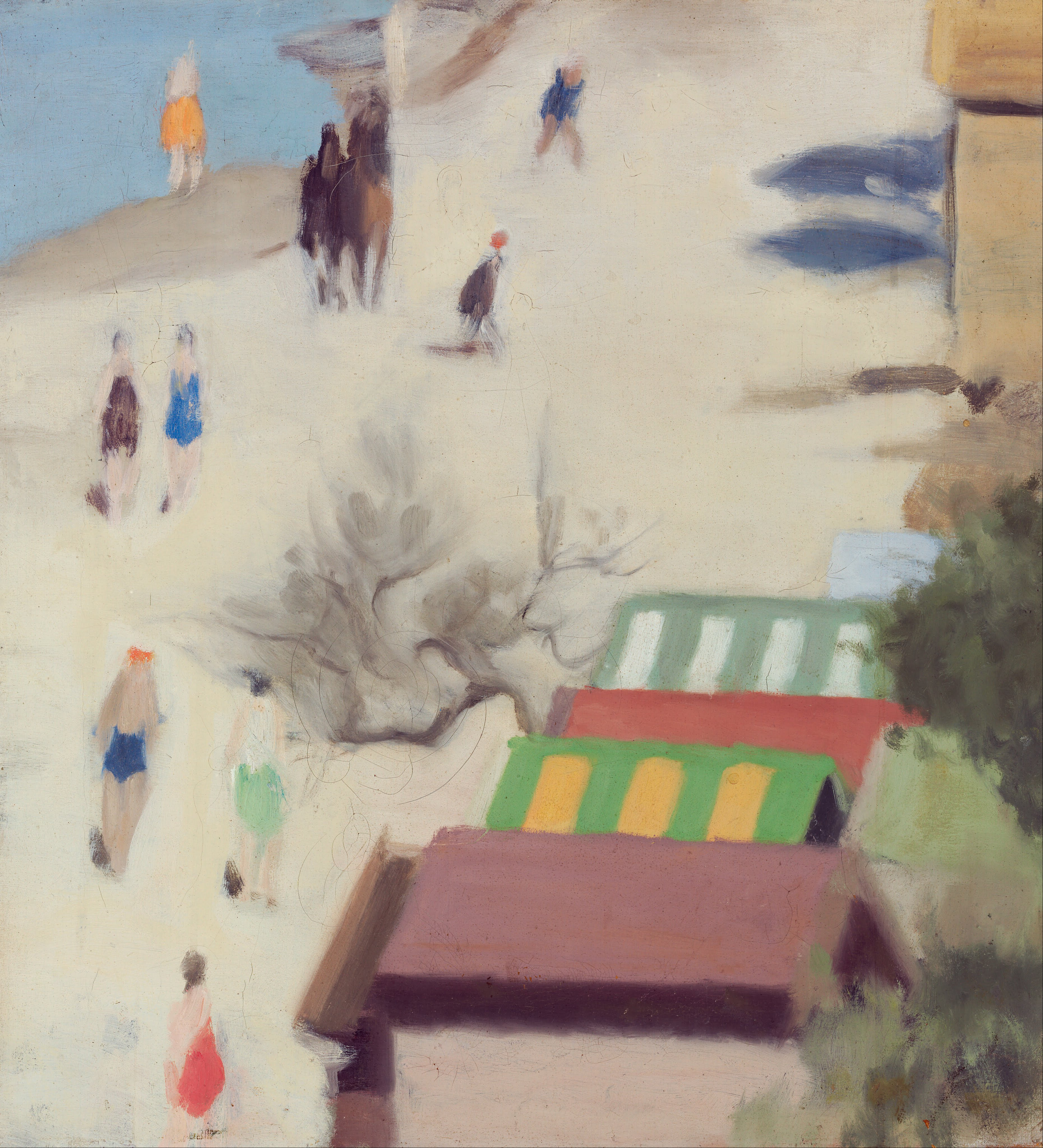
Sandringham Beach, 1933, National Gallery of Australia

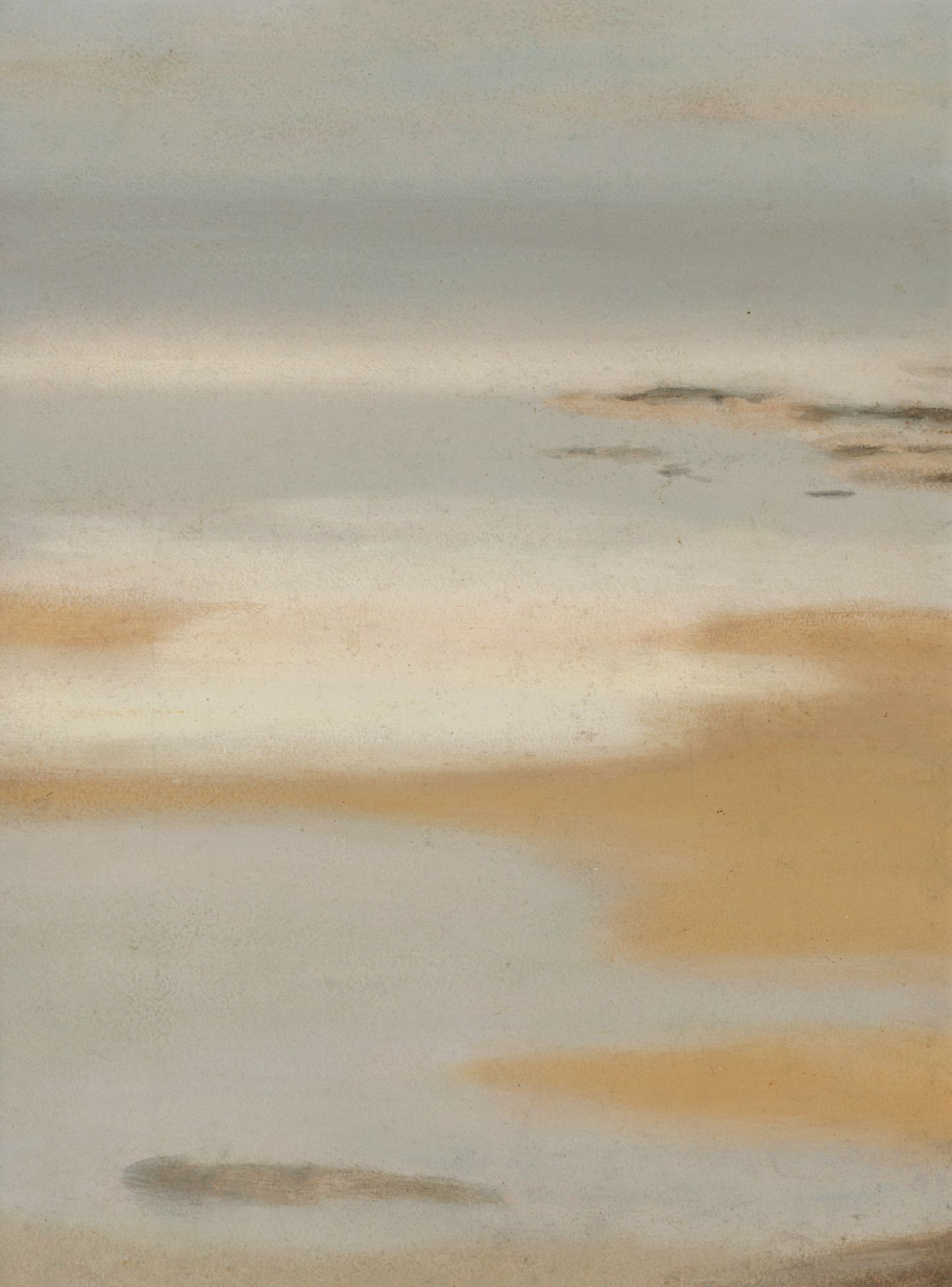
Tranquility, 1933, Art Gallery of South Australia

== Exhibitions ==
=== Solo exhibitions ===
- 1923 June, Athenaeum Gallery
- 1924 September, Athenaeum Gallery
- 1925 July, Athenaeum Gallery
- 1926 July 20–31, Athenaeum Gallery
- 1927 September, Athenaeum Gallery
- 1928 July, Athenaeum Gallery
- 1929 November, Athenaeum Gallery
- 1930 October, Athenaeum Gallery
- 1931 October, Athenaeum Gallery (show opened by Max Meldrum)
- 1932 March, The Meldrum Gallery
- 1932 October, Athenaeum Gallery
- 1933 November, The Meldrum Gallery

=== Group exhibitions ===
- 1918 May, Victorian Artists' Society Autumn Exhibition, East Melbourne
- 1918 September, Victorian Artists' Society Spring Exhibition, East Melbourne
- 1919 September, A Meldrum Group, Athenaeum Gallery
- 1920 June, A Meldrum Group, Athenaeum Gallery
- 1921 May, A Meldrum Group, Athenaeum Gallery
- 1922 May, Victorian Artists' Society Autumn Exhibition, East Melbourne
- 1922 November, Victorian Artists' Society Spring Exhibition, East Melbourne
- 1923 April, Victorian Artists' Society Autumn Exhibition, East Melbourne
- 1923 July, Twenty Melbourne Painters, Athenaeum Gallery
- 1923 October, Victorian Artists' Society Spring Exhibition, East Melbourne
- 1924 May, Twenty Melbourne Painters, Athenaeum Gallery
- 1925 September, Twenty Melbourne Painters, Athenaeum Gallery
- 1926 September, Twenty Melbourne Painters, Athenaeum Gallery
- 1926 December, Women's Art Club, Athenaeum Gallery
- 1927 July, Women's Art Club, Athenaeum Gallery
- 1927 September, Twenty Melbourne Painters, Athenaeum Gallery
- 1928 September, Twenty Melbourne Painters, Athenaeum Gallery
- 1928 October, Melbourne Society of Women Painters, Athenaeum Gallery
- 1929 September, Twenty Melbourne Painters, Athenaeum Gallery
- 1929 October, Melbourne Society of Women Painters, Athenaeum Gallery
- 1930 September, Twenty Melbourne Painters, Athenaeum Gallery
- 1930 October, Melbourne Society of Women Painters, Athenaeum Gallery
- 1931 September, Twenty Melbourne Painters, Athenaeum Gallery
- 1931 October, Melbourne Society of Women Painters, Athenaeum Gallery
- 1931 First Contemporary All-Australian Art Exhibition, at the International Art Centre of the Roerich Museum, New York
- 1932 September, Twenty Melbourne Painters, Athenaeum Gallery
- 1933 March, Meldrum Gallery
- 1933 September, Twenty Melbourne Painters, Athenaeum Gallery
- 1934 September, Twenty Melbourne Painters, Athenaeum Gallery
- 1934 October, A Meldrum Group, Athenaeum Gallery

=== Selected posthumous exhibitions ===
- 1936 Athenaeum Gallery (Memorial Exhibition)
- 1971-2 Homage to Clarice Beckett (1887–1935) : Idylls of Melbourne and Beaumaris. Rosalind Humphries Galleries, Melbourne
- 1973 "Clarice Beckett", David Sumner Galleries, Adelaide
- 1975 Macquarie Galleries, Sydney
- 1978 Clarice Beckett 1887-1935, 58 Wattle Valley Road, Canterbury, 29 October
- 1979 Realities, Melbourne (Retrospective Exhibition)
- 1979 Macquarie Galleries, Sydney, accompanying launch of Rosalind Hollinrake's book Clarice Beckett–The Artist and Her Circle
- 1980 Gallery Huntly, Canberra
- 1995 "In a Certain Light" (with Olive Cotton), The University of New South Wales Ivan Dougherty Gallery, Sydney
- 1999–2000 "Politically incorrect: Clarice Beckett" A retrospective touring exhibition organised by The lan Potter Museum of Art, University of Melbourne:

Ian Potter Museum of Art, The University of Melbourne, Melbourne, Victoria: 5 February 1999 – 28 March 1999
S. H. Ervin Gallery (National Trust of Australia NSW), Sydney, NSW: 24 April 1999 – 13 June 1999
Orange Regional Gallery, Orange, NSW: 19 June 1999 – 18 July 1999
Art Gallery of South Australia, Adelaide SA: 6 August 1999 – 19 September 1999
Bendigo Art Gallery, Bendigo, Victoria: 30 September 1999 – 31 October 1999
Art Gallery of Ballarat, Ballarat, Victoria: 5 November 1999 – 16 January 2000
Tasmanian Museum and Art Gallery, Hobart, Tasmania: 3 February 2000 – 26 March 2000
Burnie Regional Art Gallery, Burnie, Tasmania: 7 April 2000 – 22 May 2000

- 2000ff: Niagara Galleries, Melbourne has held three survey exhibitions of Beckett's work in 2000, 2002 and 2014.
- 2021 "Clarice Beckett: The present moment" Art Gallery of South Australia, Adelaide SA: 27 February – 16 May
- Clarice Beckett: Paintings from the National Collection, 2026

== Selected collections ==
- Australian National Gallery
- National Gallery of Victoria
- Art Gallery of New South Wales
- QAGOMA
- Art Gallery of South Australia
- State Library Victoria

== Bibliography ==
Books

- Colahan, Colin (1996). Colin Colahan: A Portrait. Melbourne University Publishing. ISBN 0522847102.
- Fenner, Felicity (1995). In a Certain Light: Clarice Beckett, Olive Cotton. Ivan Dougherty Gallery. ISBN 0733410014.
- Hollinrake, Rosalind (1979a). Clarice Beckett, the Artist and Her Circle. Macmillan. ISBN 0333252438.
- Hollinrake, Rosalind (1999). Clarice Beckett: Politically Incorrect. Ian Potter Museum of Art. ISBN 0734015933.
- Jorgensen, Sigmund (2014). Montsalvat: The Intimate Story of an Australian Artists' Colony. Allen & Unwin. ISBN 978-1743312728.
- Lock, Tracey (2008). Misty Moderns: Australian Tonalists 1915-1950. Art Gallery of South Australia. ISBN 978-0730830153.
- Lock, Tracey (2021). The Present Moment: the Art of Clarice Beckett. Art Gallery of South Australia. ISBN 978-1921668463.
- McAuliffe, Chris (1996). Art and Suburbia: A World Art Book. Craftsman House. ISBN 9766410291.
- McGuire, Margaret E. (1984). The Singular Career of Clarice Beckett: Painting and Society in Melbourne 1916-1936 (Thesis for Master of Arts ed.). Carlton, Vic.: Department of Fine Arts, University of Melbourne.
- Perry, John R.; Perry, Peter W. (1996). Max Meldrum and Associates: Their Art, Lives and Influences. Castlemaine Art Gallery and Historical Museum. ISBN 0959806679.
- Tasca, Margot (2014). Percy Leason: An Artist's Life. Thames & Hudson Australia. ISBN 978-0500500798.
- Ziegler, Edith M. (2022). The Worlds and Work of Clarice Beckett. Australian Scholarly Publishing Pty, Limited. ISBN 978-1922669384.

Journals

- Bell, Jenny (2003). "Clarice Beckett: A Private Conversation". Art and Australia. 41 (1). Art and Australia Pty. Ltd.: 108–114.
- Holt, Stephanie (1995). "Woman About Town: Urban Images of the 1920s and 1930s". Art and Australia. 33 (2). Art and Australia Pty. Ltd.: 232–243.
- McFarlane, Jenny (1999). "Clarice Beckett's Open Road: Suggestions of an Unseen Dimension to the Familiar". Art and Australia. 37 (2). Art and Australia Pty. Ltd.
- McGuire, M. A. (1986). "'Life and Your Imagining': The Art of Clarice Beckett". Australian Journal of Art. 5 (1). Art Association of Australia: 90–103. doi:10.1080/03146464.1986.11432882.
- McGuire, Peg (2012). "'The Silver Thread': Clarice Beckett and Her Brother". Victorian Historical Journal. 83 (2). Royal Historical Society of Victoria: 276–285.
- Thomas, Daniel (2021). "Clarice Beckett's Edgy Calm". Art Monthly Australasia (329). Art Monthly Australia Ltd.: 68–73.
- Wallace-Crabbe, Robin (1999). "Eloquent Silence: Paintings by Clarice Beckett". Art and Australia. 35 (2). Art and Australia Pty. Ltd.

Webpages

- Hollinrake, Elizabeth (1979b). "Beckett, Clarice Marjoribanks (1887–1935)". Australian Dictionary of Biography.
