= Damer (crater) =

Crater on Mercury

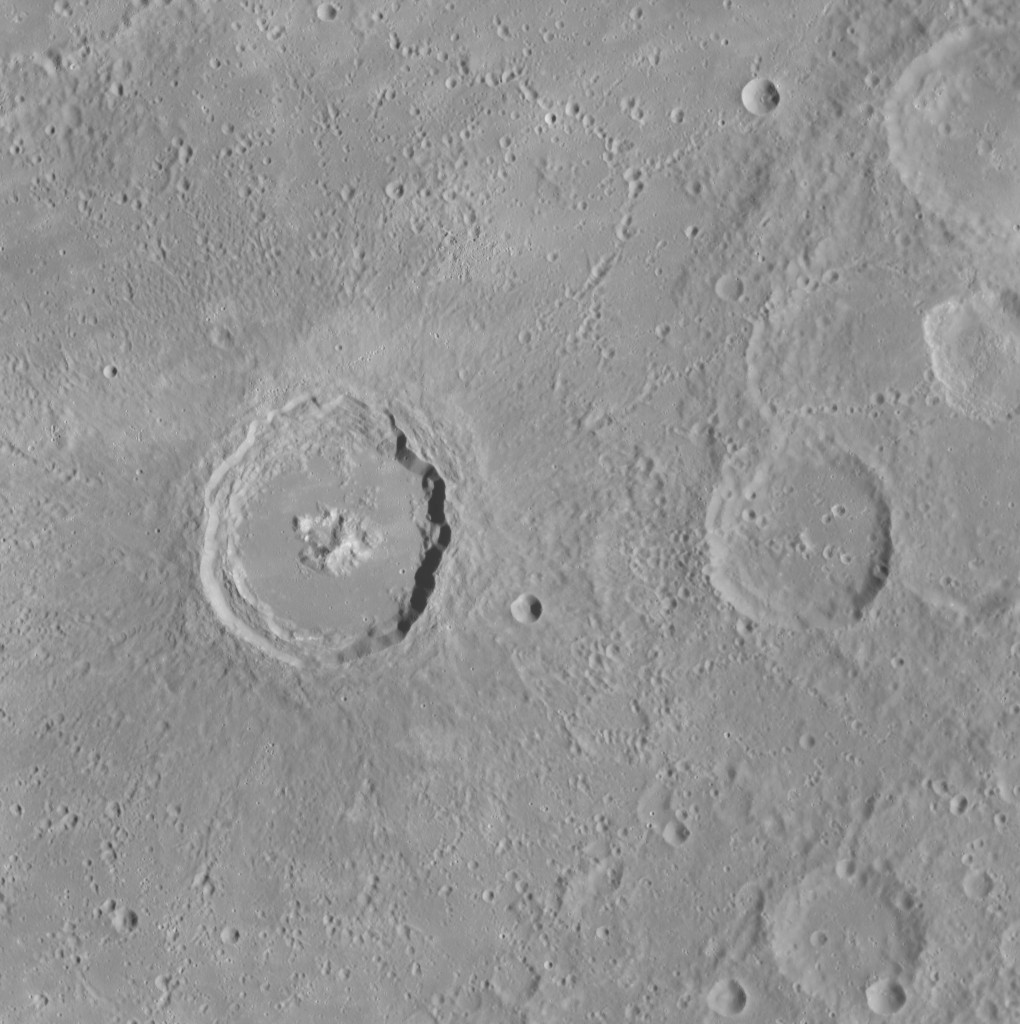
- MESSENGER WAC image of Damer
- Feature type: Central-peak impact crater
- Location: Shakespeare quadrangle, Mercury
- Coordinates: 36.36°N 115.81°W
- Diameter: 60 km (37 mi)
- Eponym: Anne Seymour Damer

Damer is a crater on Mercury in the Shakespeare quadrangle. Its diameter is 60 km. It was named after the English sculptor Anne Seymour Damer in 2013.

== Views ==
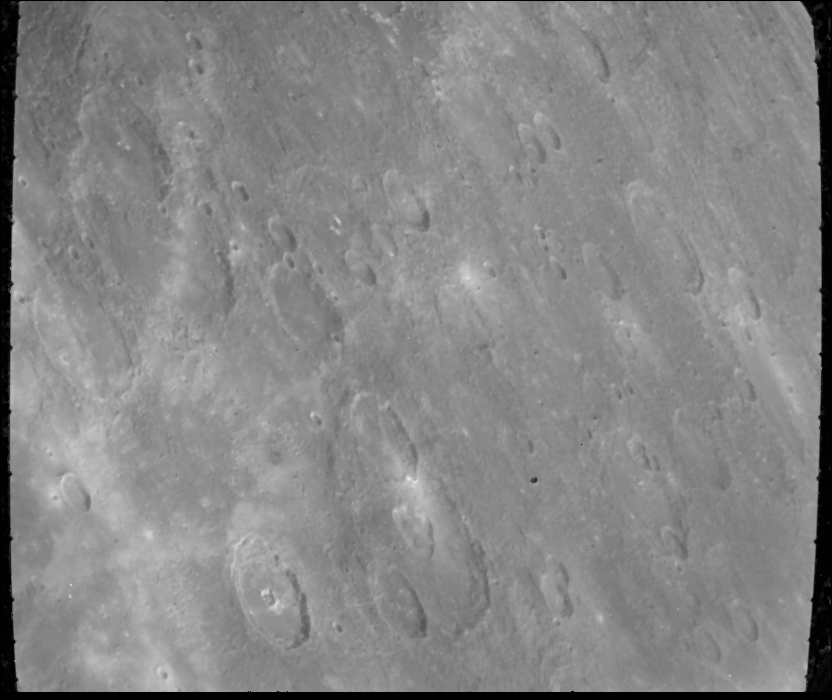
Mariner 10 image with Damer in lower left

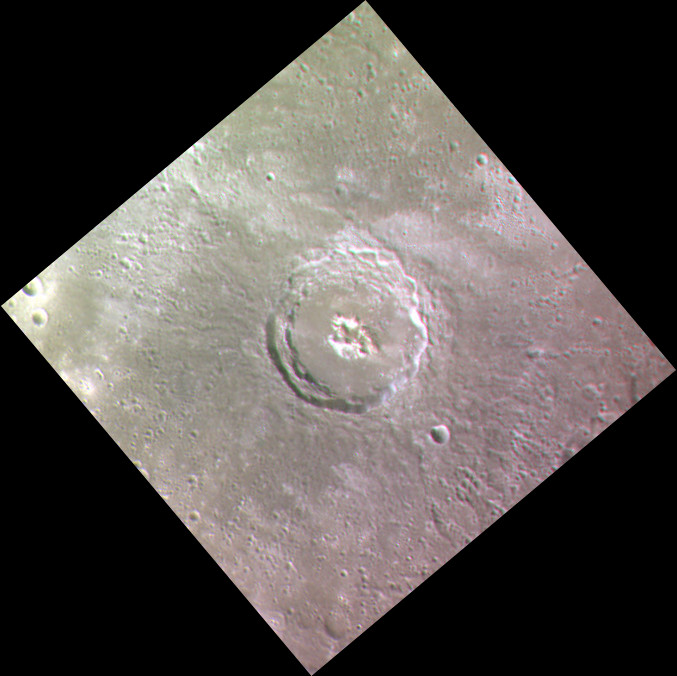
Approximate color image by MESSENGER

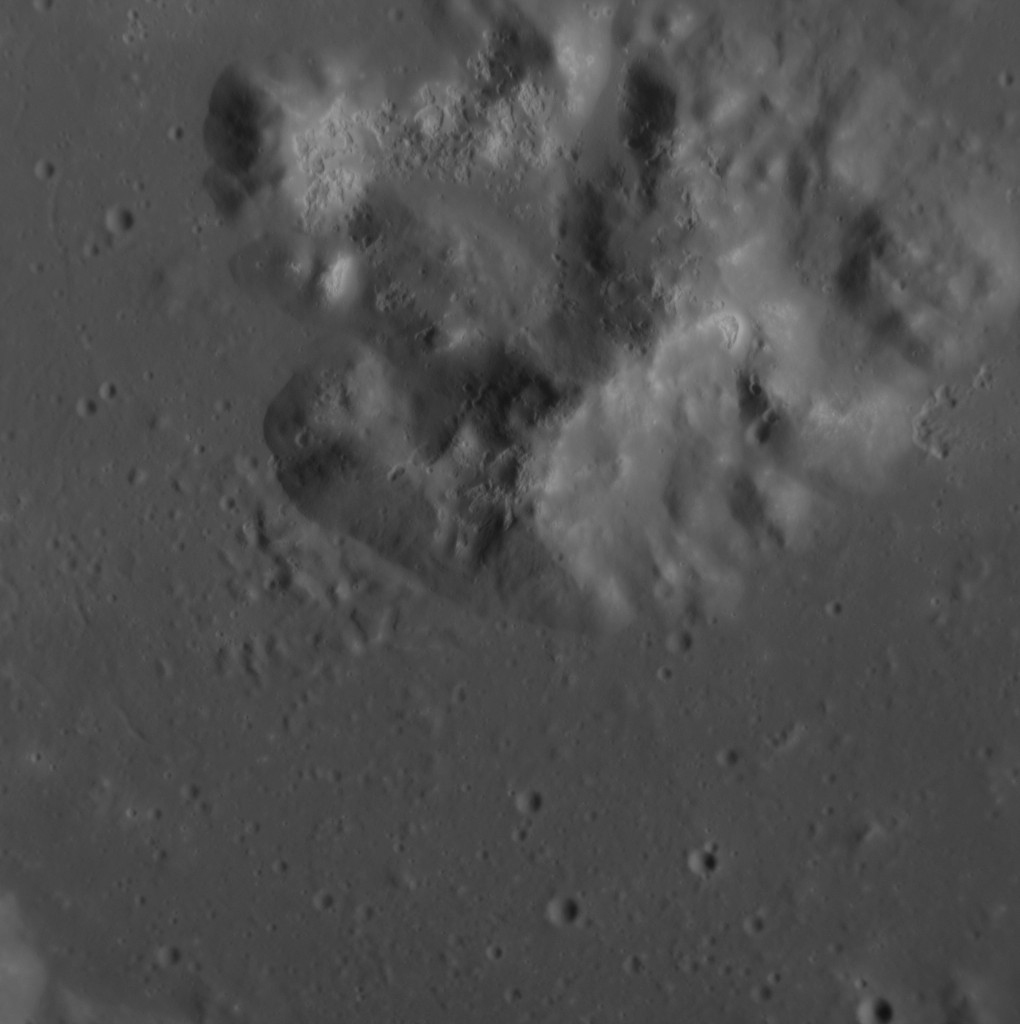
Central peak complex of Damer, showing abundant hollows

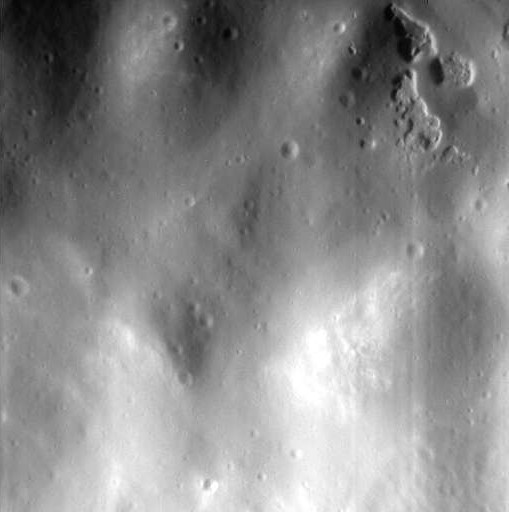
High-resolution image of one of the hollows (upper right) on the east side of the central peak. The image is about 2.8 km wide.

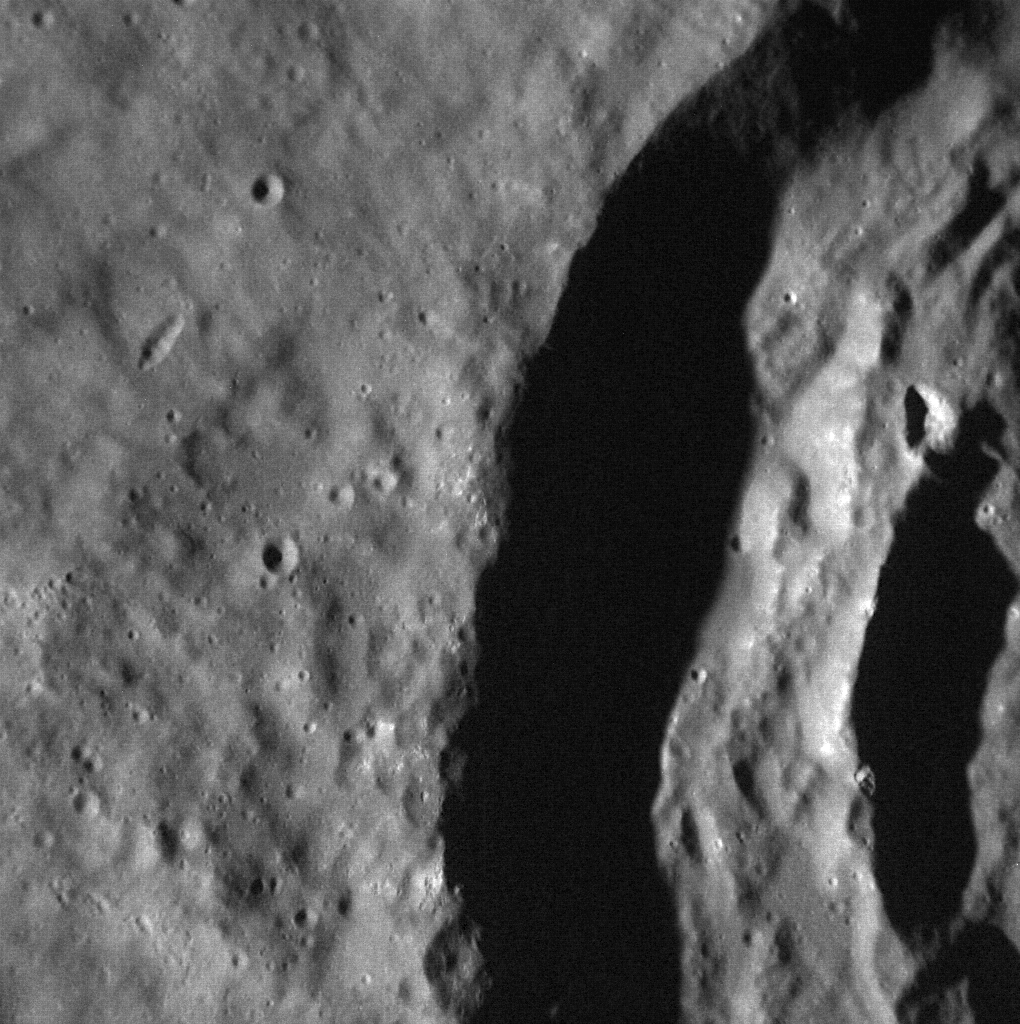
Close-up of the west wall
