= Glinka (crater) =

Crater on Mercury

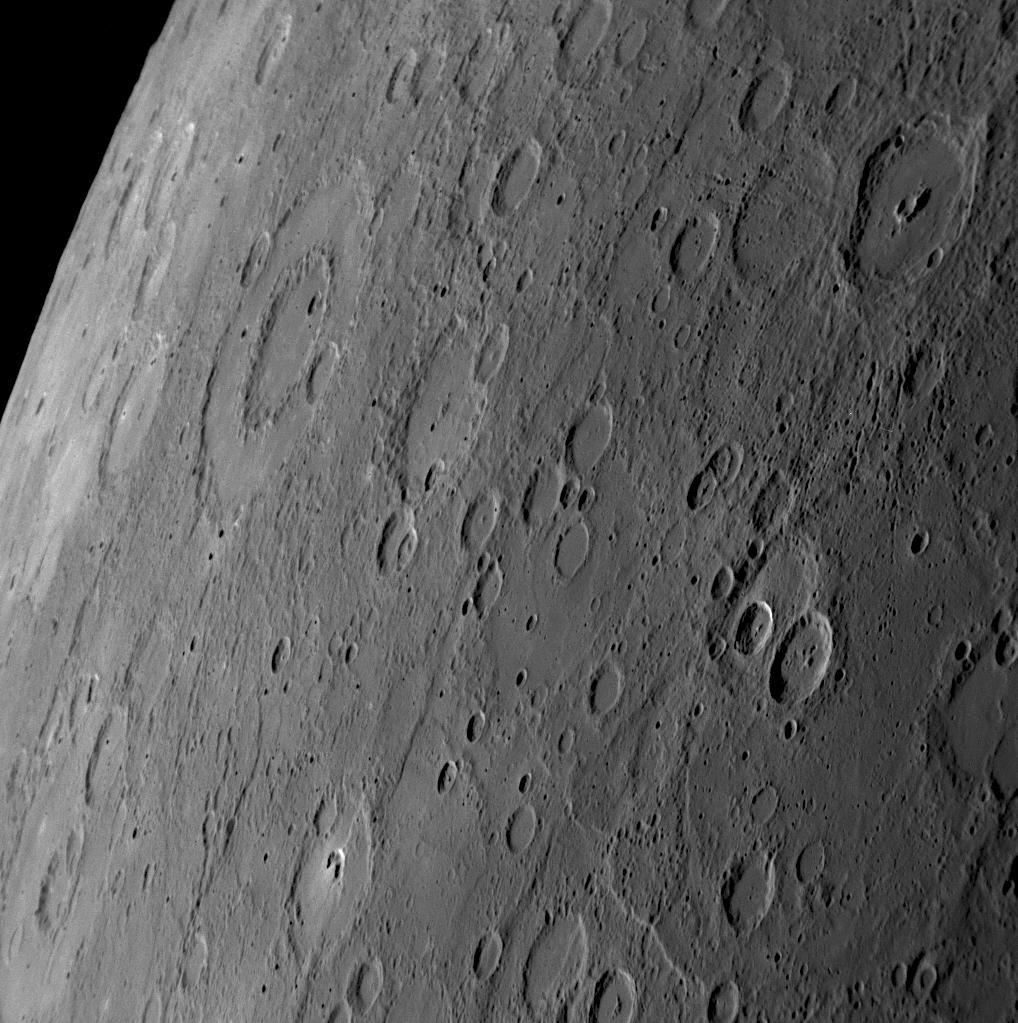
- Photo from MESSENGER's first flyby in January 2008 with Glinka at bottom center
- Feature type: Impact crater
- Location: Beethoven quadrangle, Mercury
- Coordinates: 14.83°N 112.55°W
- Diameter: 89 km (55 mi)
- Eponym: Mikhail Glinka

Glinka is a pit-floored crater on Mercury, which was discovered in 1974 by Mariner 10 spacecraft. It was named by the IAU in 2008, after Russian composer Mikhail Glinka.

Its floor is covered by the smooth plain material and displays a kidney-shaped collapse feature, which is also called a central pit. The size of the pit, which was first noticed in MESSENGER images obtained in January 2008, is 20 × 8.5 km. It is surrounded by a bright pyroclastic deposit. Such a feature may have resulted from collapse of a magma chamber underlying the central part of the crater. The collapse feature is an analog of Earth's volcanic calderas.

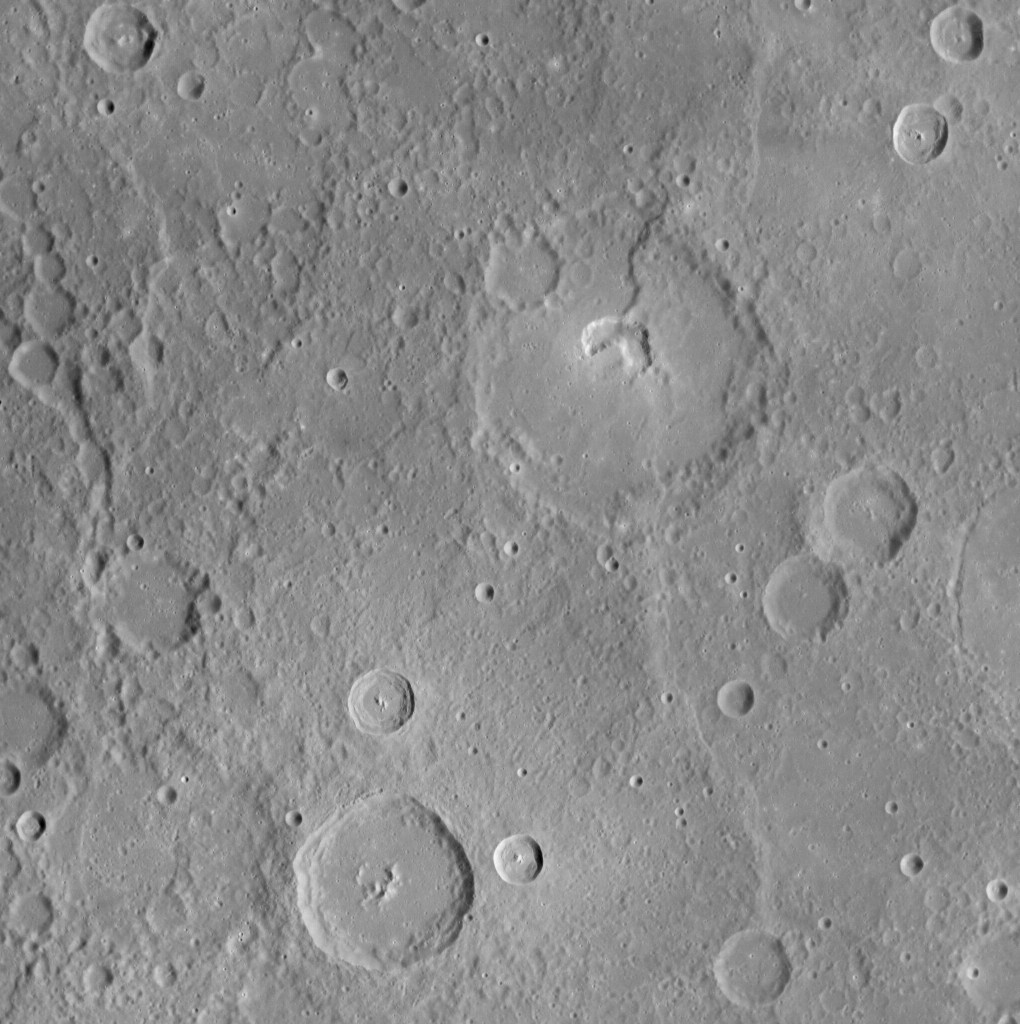
Glinka crater

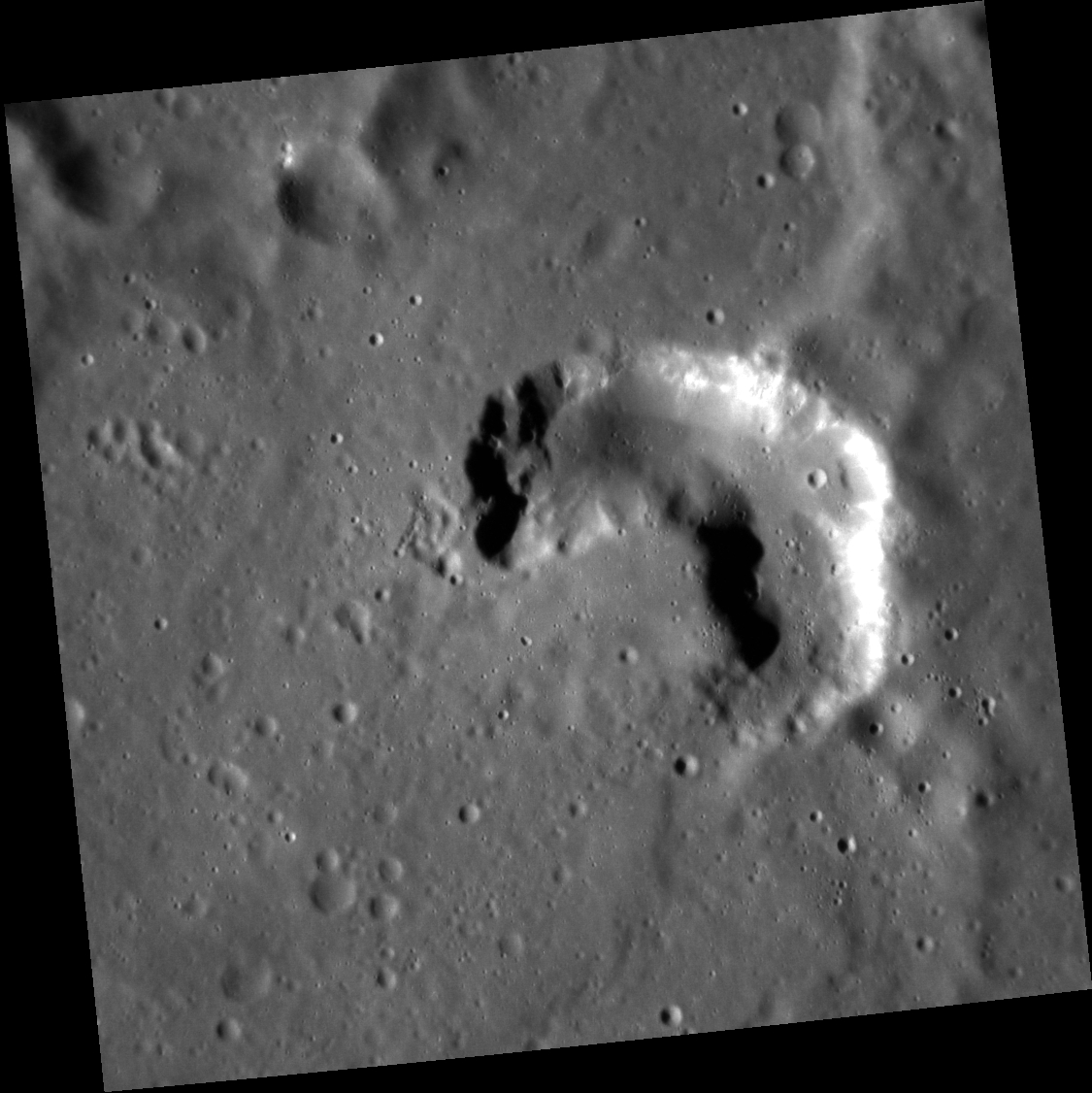
Closeup of the central pit
