= Tsʻao Chan (crater) =

Crater on Mercury

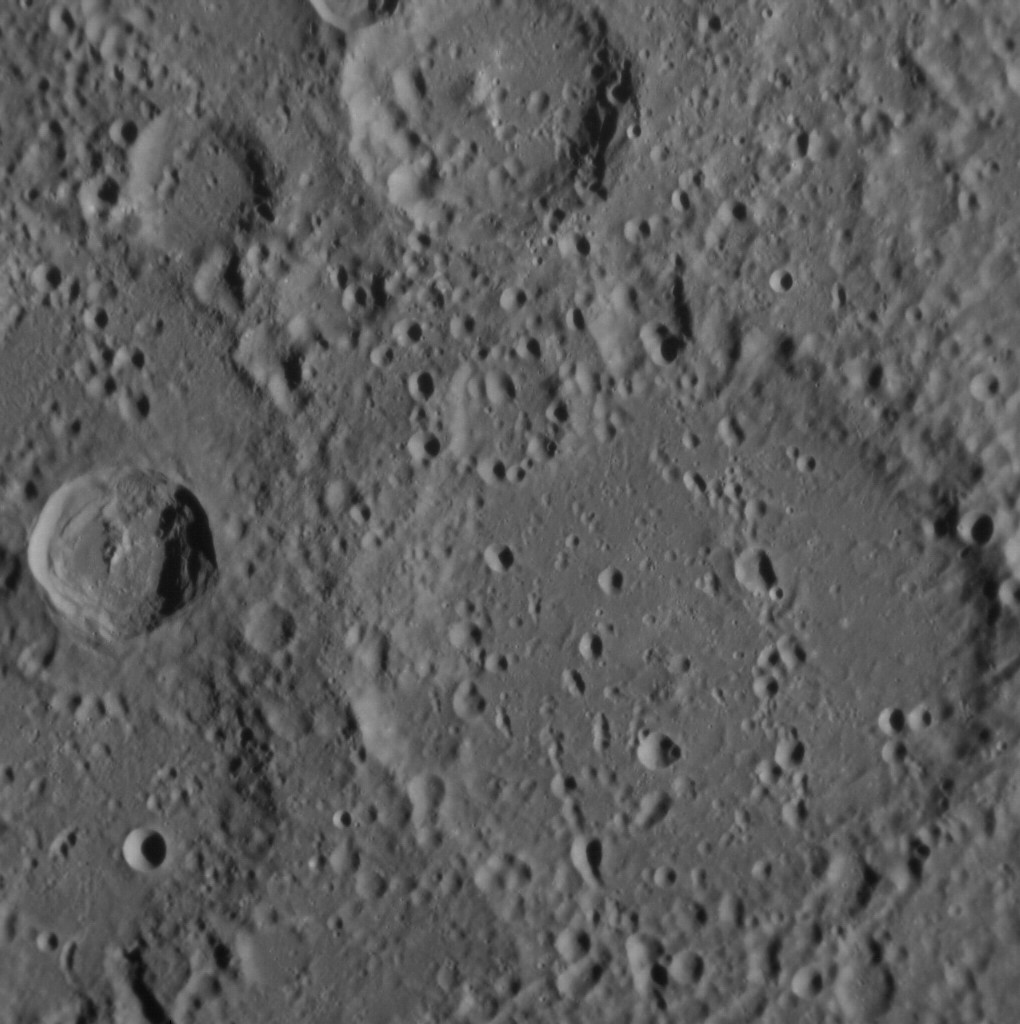
- MESSENGER image
- Planet: Mercury
- Coordinates: 13.31°S 142.35°W
- Quadrangle: Beethoven
- Diameter: 110 km (68 mi)
- Eponym: Cao Xueqin (Tsʻao Chan)

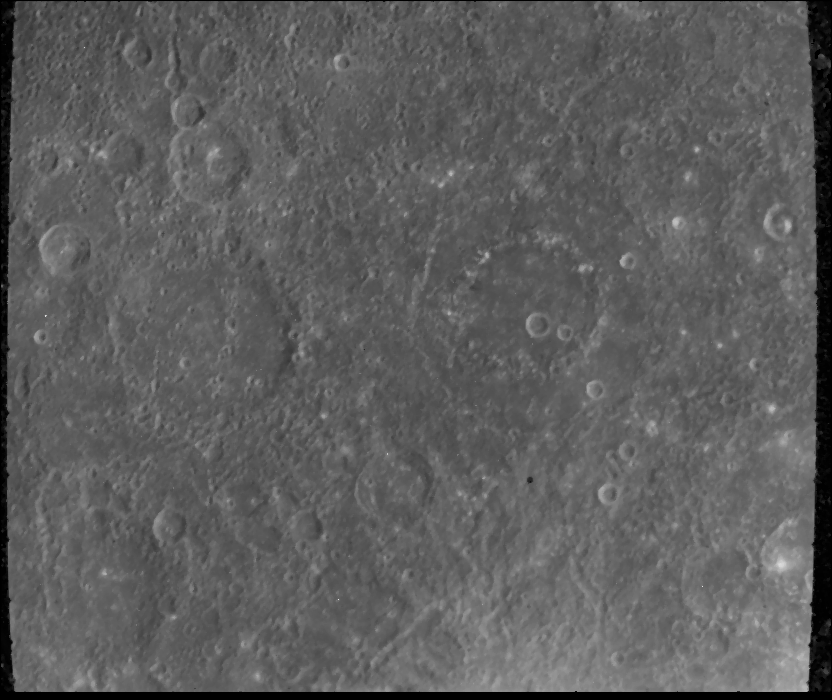
Mariner 10 image, with Tsʻao Chan at left

Tsʻao Chan is a crater on Mercury. Its name was adopted by the International Astronomical Union (IAU) in 1976, for the Chinese writer Tsʻao Chan.

Tsʻao Chan is to the southwest of the larger crater Mark Twain.
