= Schoenberg (crater) =

Crater on Mercury

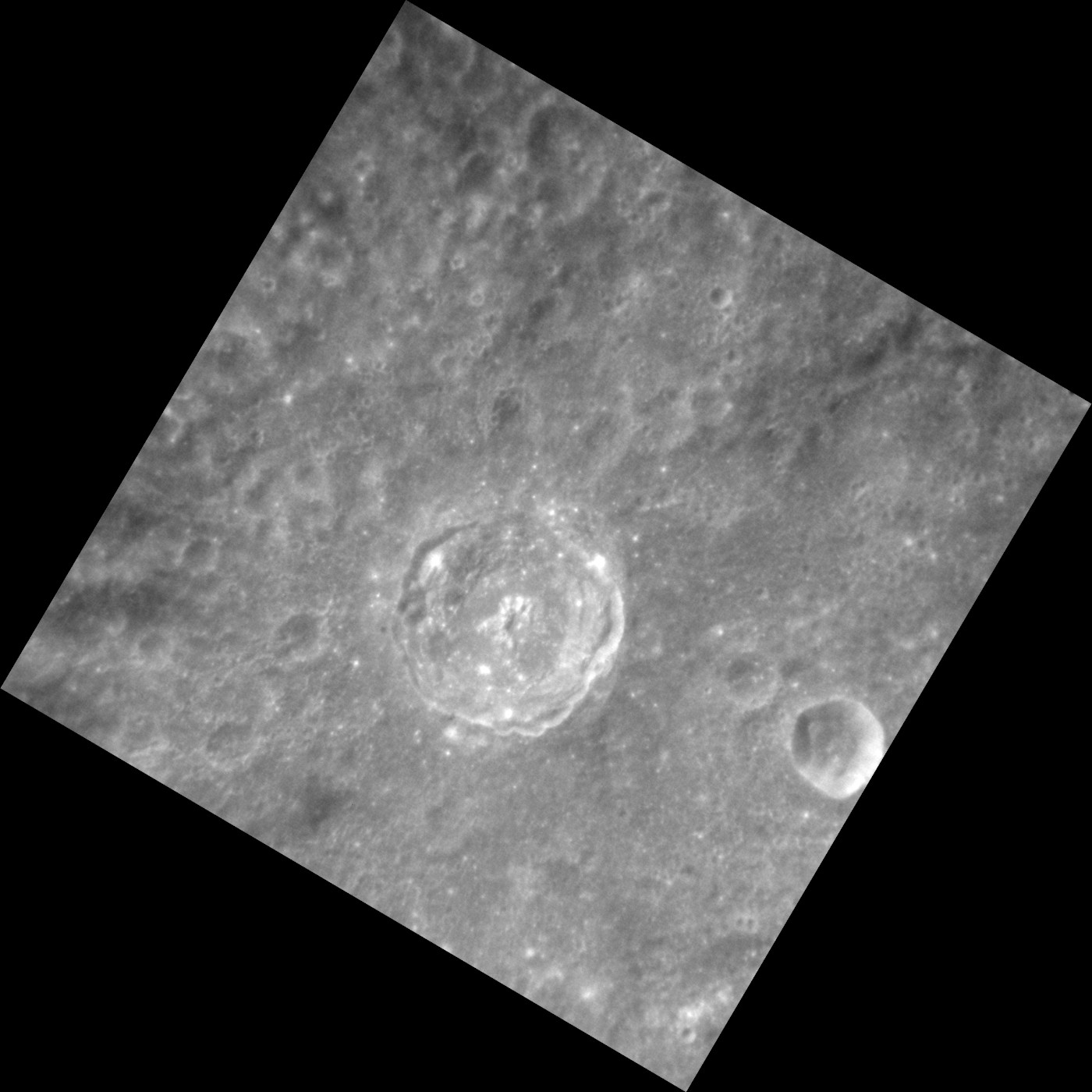
- MESSENGER NAC
- Planet: Mercury
- Coordinates: 16.06°S 136.08°W
- Quadrangle: Beethoven
- Diameter: 28.0 km (17.4 mi)
- Eponym: Arnold Schoenberg

Schoenberg is a crater on Mercury. Its name was adopted by the International Astronomical Union (IAU) in 1976. The crater is named for Austrian composer Arnold Schoenberg.

Schoenberg has a ray system.

To the east of Schoenberg is the Beethoven basin. To the northwest is the crater Mark Twain.

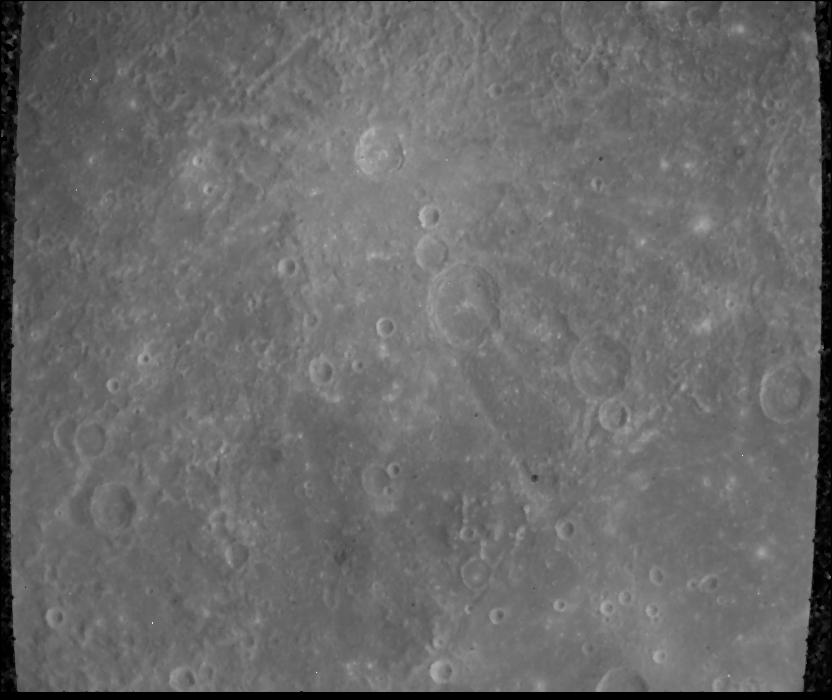
Mariner 10 image with Schoenberg near top center

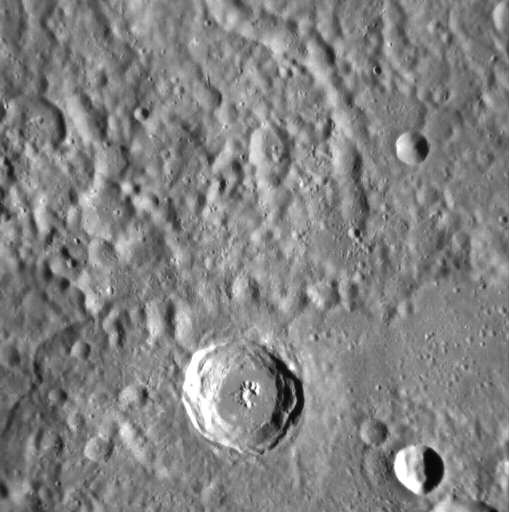
Another view
