= Wang Meng (crater) =

Crater on Mercury

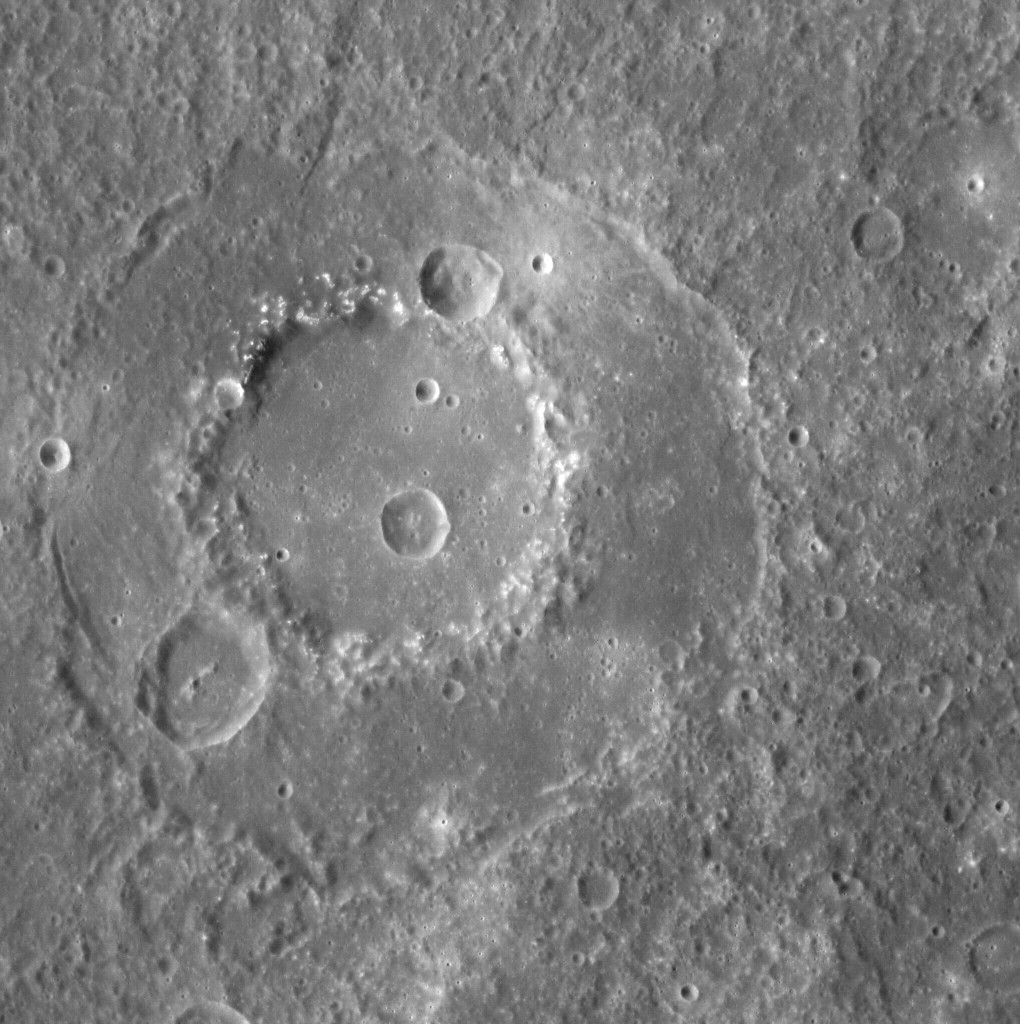
- MESSENGER WAC image
- Planet: Mercury
- Coordinates: 8.53°N 104.12°W
- Quadrangle: Beethoven
- Diameter: 165 km (103 mi)
- Eponym: Wang Meng

Wang Meng is a crater on Mercury. Its name was adopted by the International Astronomical Union (IAU) in 1976. The crater is named for the Chinese painter Wang Meng.

Wang Meng is one of 110 peak ring basins on Mercury.

Hollows are present within Wang Meng. A confirmed dark spot is present in along the northwestern peak ring.

The crater Judah Ha-Levi is to the northwest of Wang Meng. To the south is Chu Ta, to the southeast is Rajnis, and to the north is Chiang Kʽui.

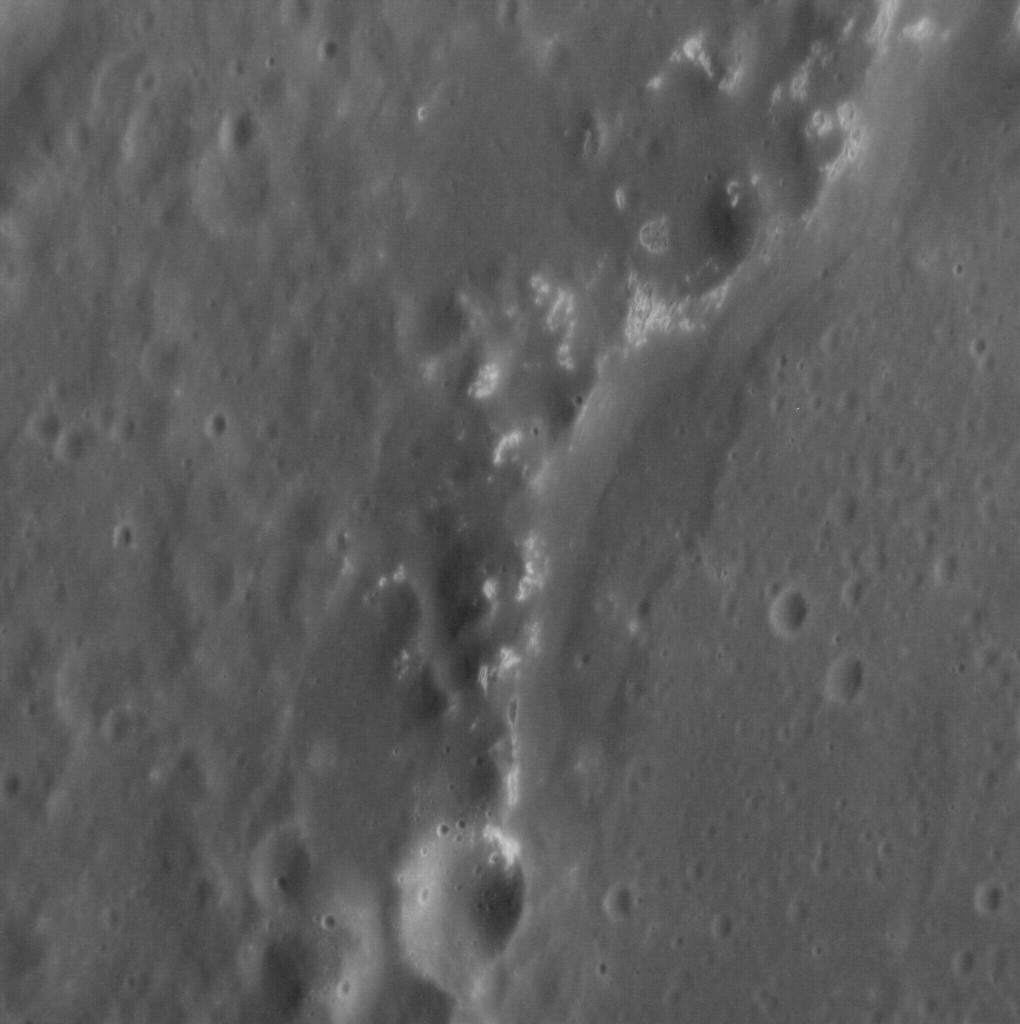
Hollows along northwest inner ring of Wang Meng

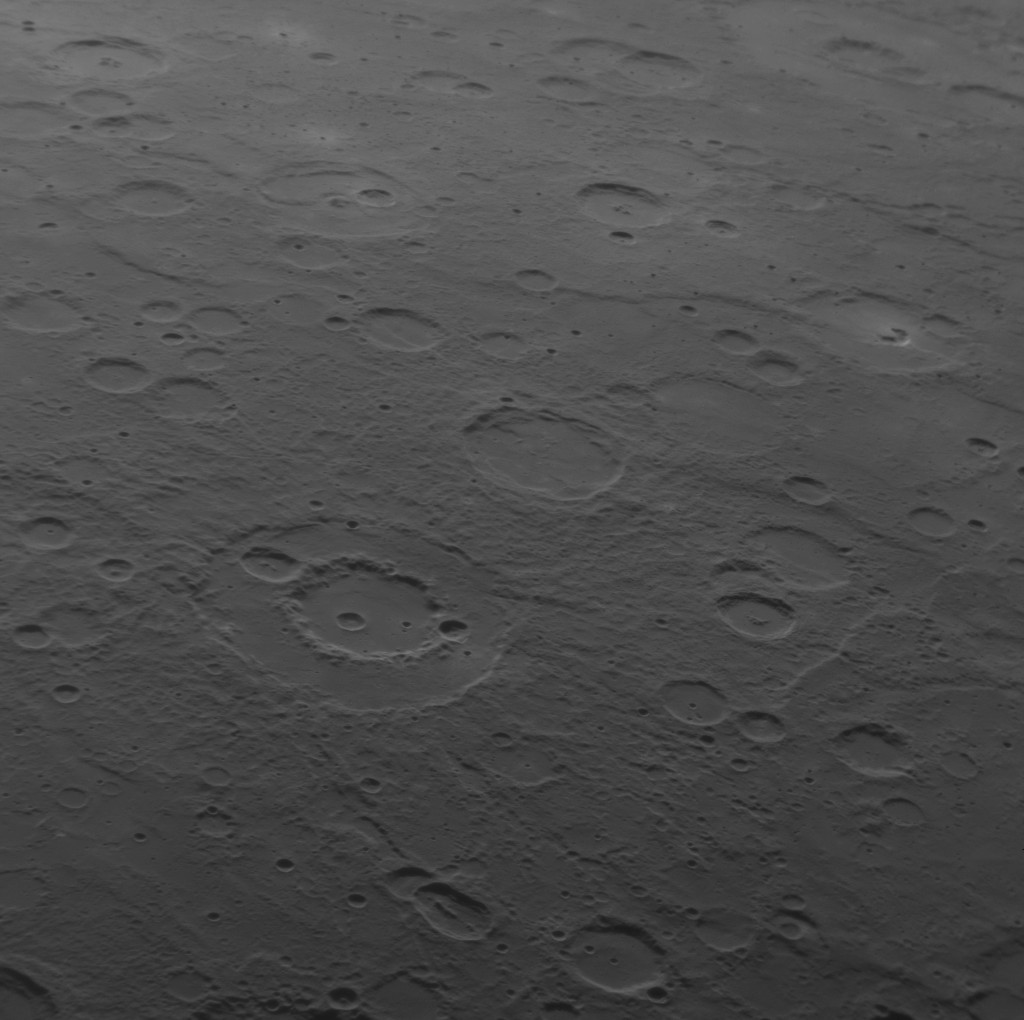
Regional view from MESSENGER's first flyby showing Wang Meng below left of center, Judah Ha-Levi at center, and Glinka in upper right.
