= Rajnis (crater) =

Crater on Mercury

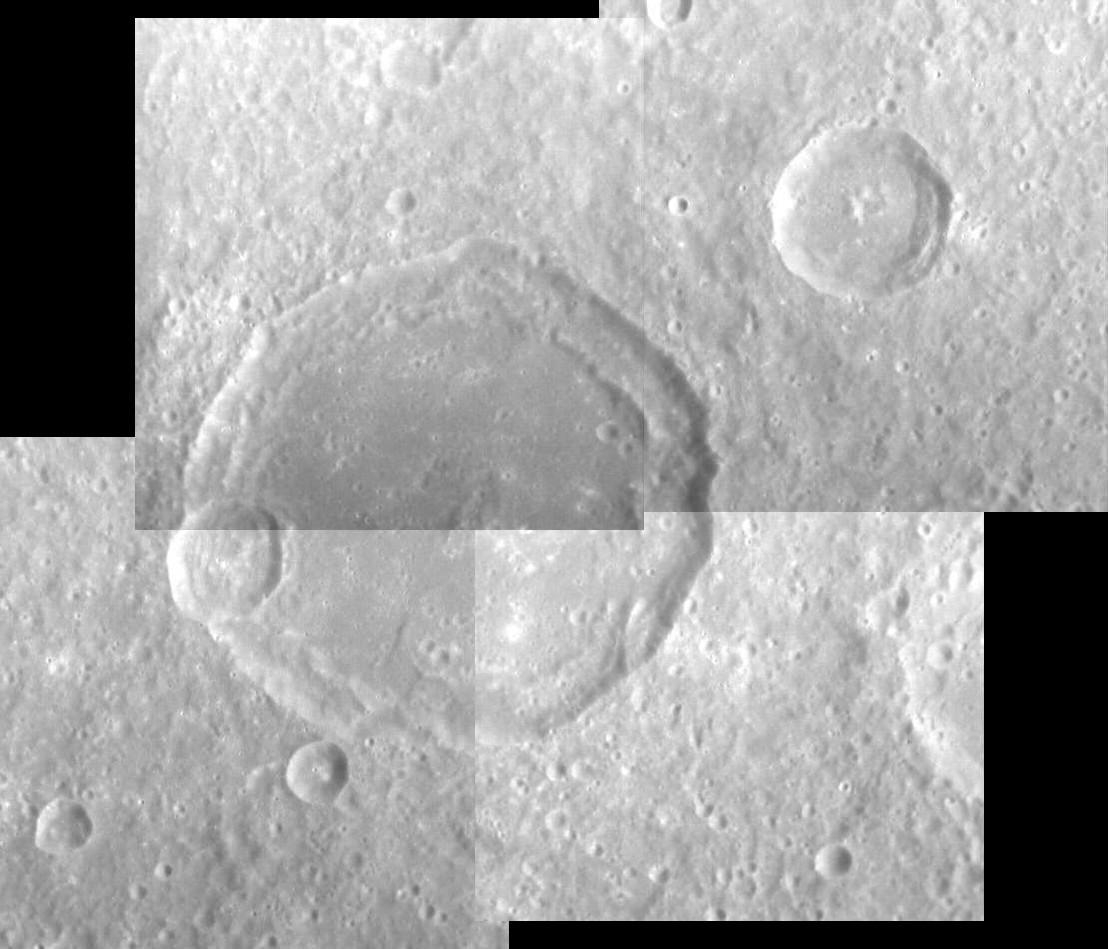
- MESSENGER mosaic
- Planet: Mercury
- Coordinates: 4.36°N 96.21°W
- Quadrangle: Beethoven
- Diameter: 80 km (50 mi)
- Eponym: Rainis

Rajnis is a crater on Mercury. Its name was adopted by the International Astronomical Union (IAU) in 1976. The crater is named for the Latvian poet Jānis Pliekšāns, known by his pseudonym of Rainis.

Rajnis is east of the craters Chu Ta and Wang Meng.
