= Flaiano =

Flaiano may refer to:

- Ennio Flaiano (1910–1972), Italian screenwriter, playwright, novelist, journalist and drama critic
- Flaiano (crater), a crater on Mercury
- Premi Flaiano, an international award given in Italy
