= Bilokur (crater) =

Crater on Mercury

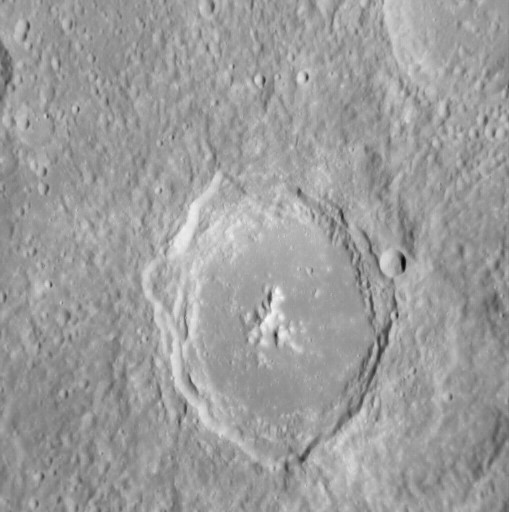
- MESSENGER NAC
- Planet: Mercury
- Coordinates: 0.79°S 108.33°W
- Quadrangle: Beethoven
- Diameter: 67.0 km (41.6 mi)
- Eponym: Kateryna Bilokur

Bilokur is a crater on Mercury. Its name was adopted by the International Astronomical Union (IAU) on November 14, 2024. The crater is named for Ukrainian painter Kateryna Bilokur.

Bilokur is to the southwest of the larger Chu Ta crater.

== Gallery ==
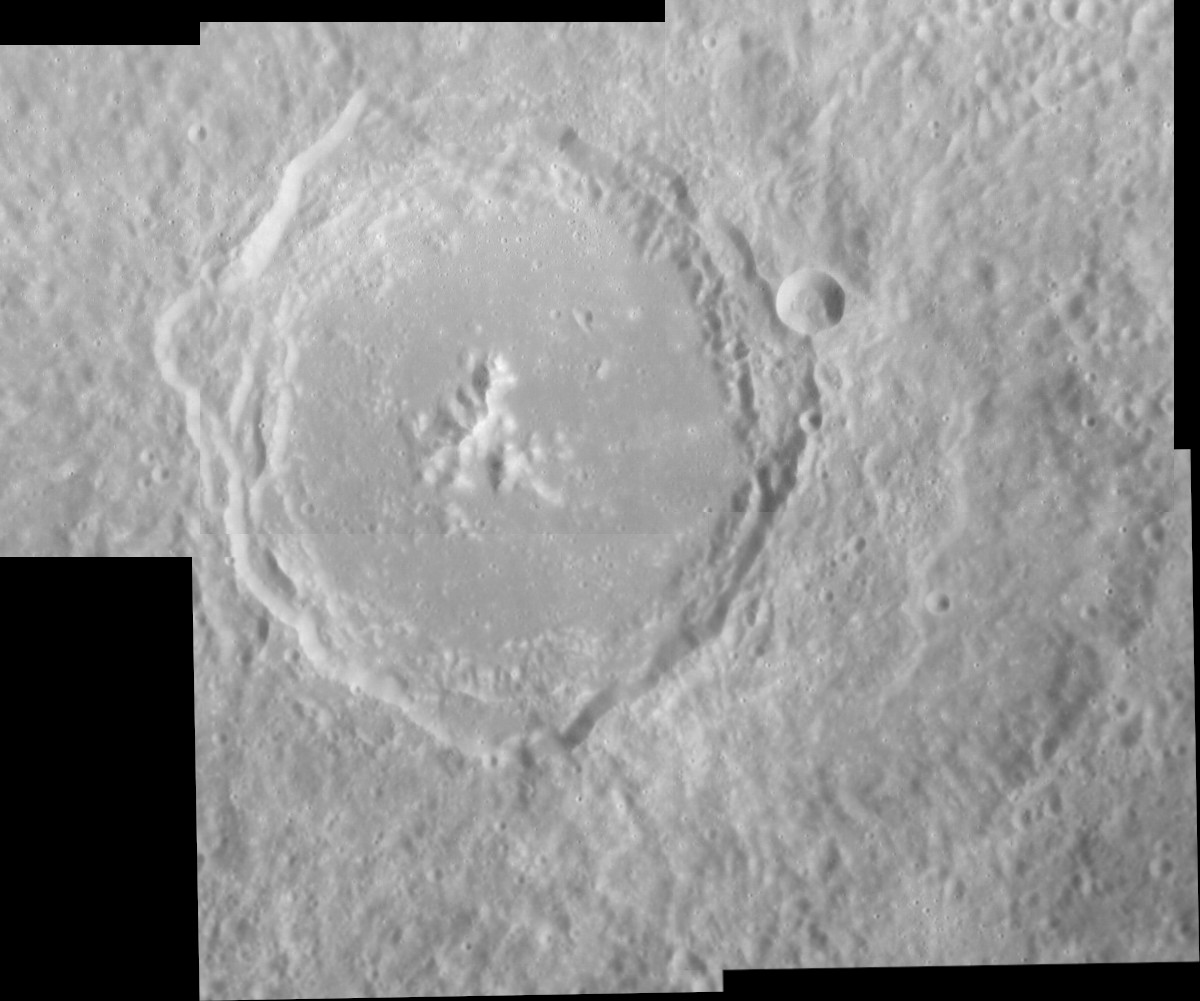
MESSENGER mosaic

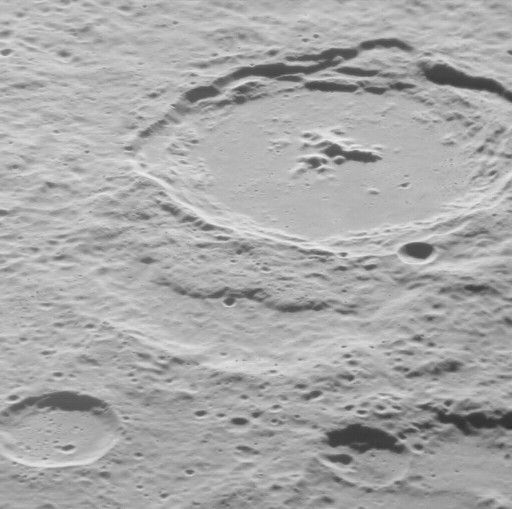
Oblique view
