= Judah Ha-Levi (crater) =

Crater on Mercury

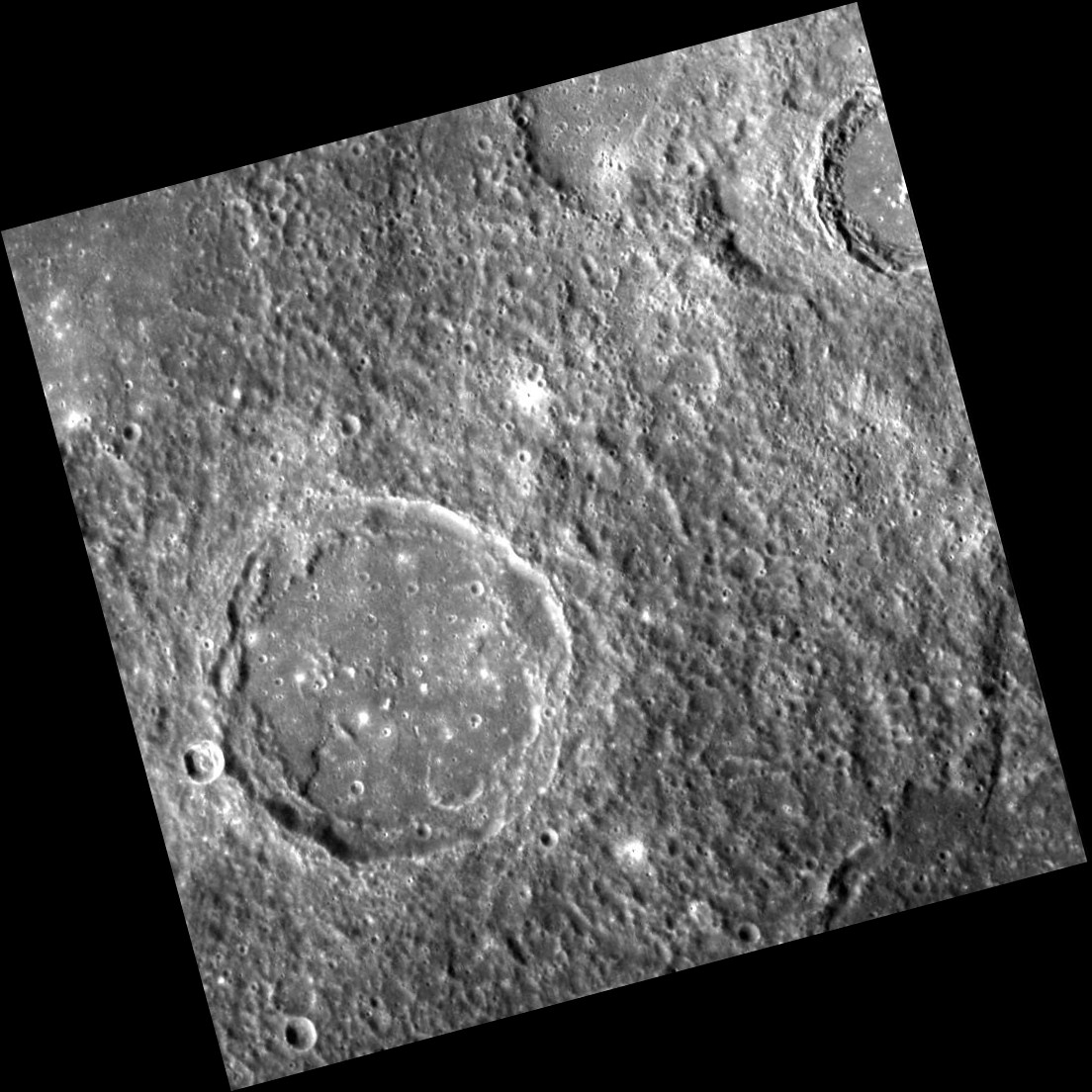
- MESSENGER WAC image of Judah Ha-Levi
- Feature type: Impact crater
- Location: Beethoven quadrangle, Mercury
- Coordinates: 10.79°N 108.01°W
- Diameter: 85 km (53 mi)
- Eponym: Judah Halevi

Judah Ha-Levi is a crater on Mercury. Its name was adopted by the International Astronomical Union (IAU) in 1976. Judah Ha-Levi is named for the Spanish-Jewish poet and philosopher Judah Ha-Levi, who lived from 1075 to 1141.

Hollows are present within Judah Ha-Levi.

To the southeast of Judah Ha-Levi is the peak ring crater Wang Meng. To the northwest is Glinka, and to the northeast is Chiang Kʽui.

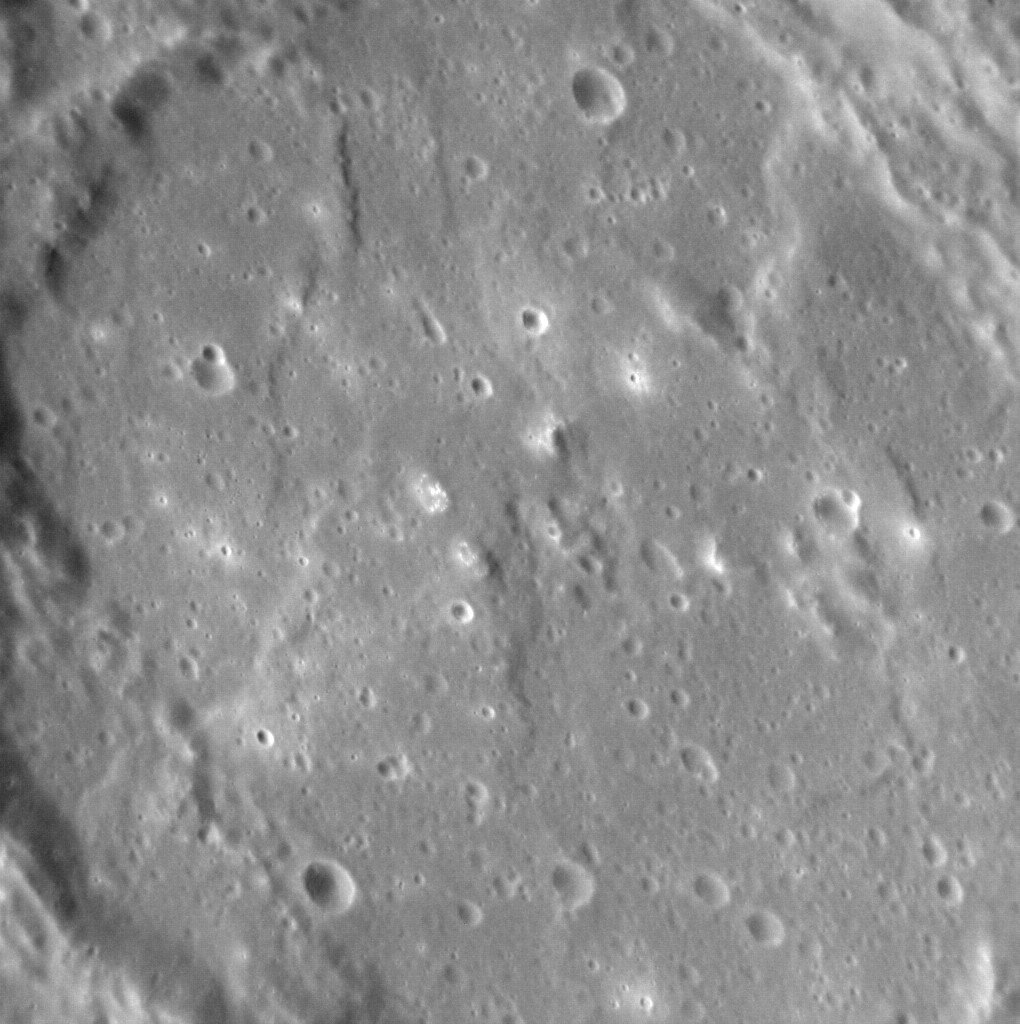
Interior of Judah Ha-Levi

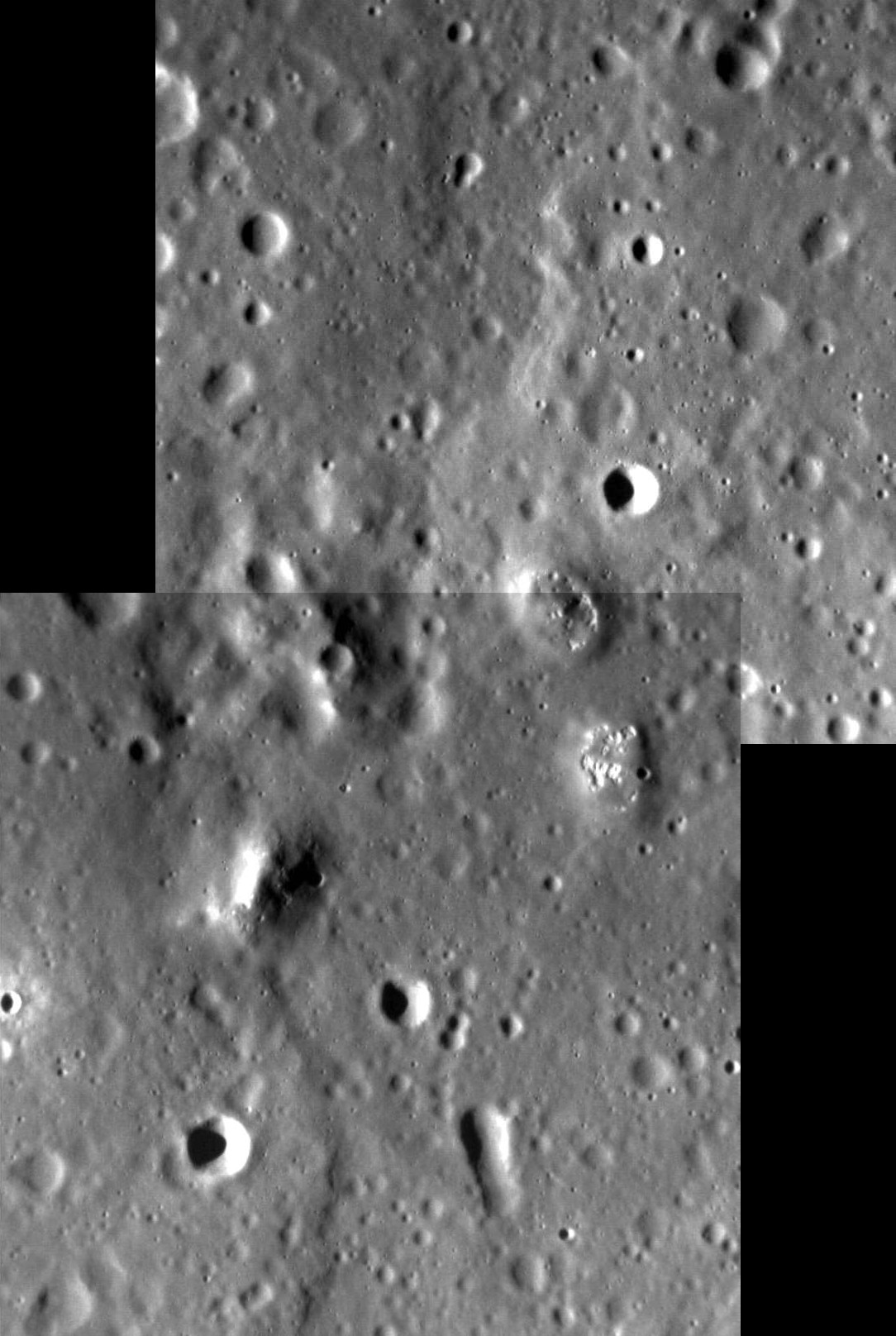
Detail of interior showing two patches of hollows right of center

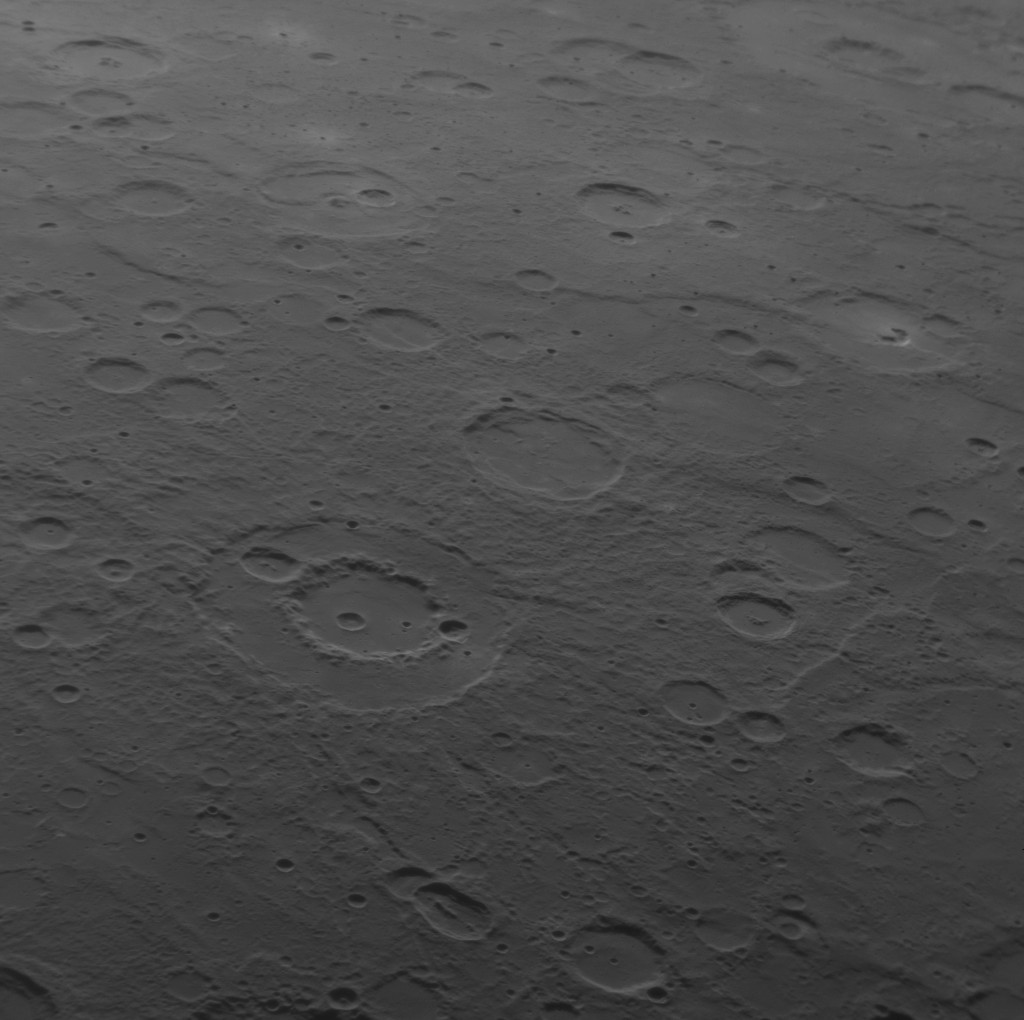
Regional view from MESSENGER's first flyby in January 2008, showing Wang Meng below left of center, Judah Ha-Levi at center, and Glinka in upper right.
