= Vivaldi (crater) =

Crater on Mercury

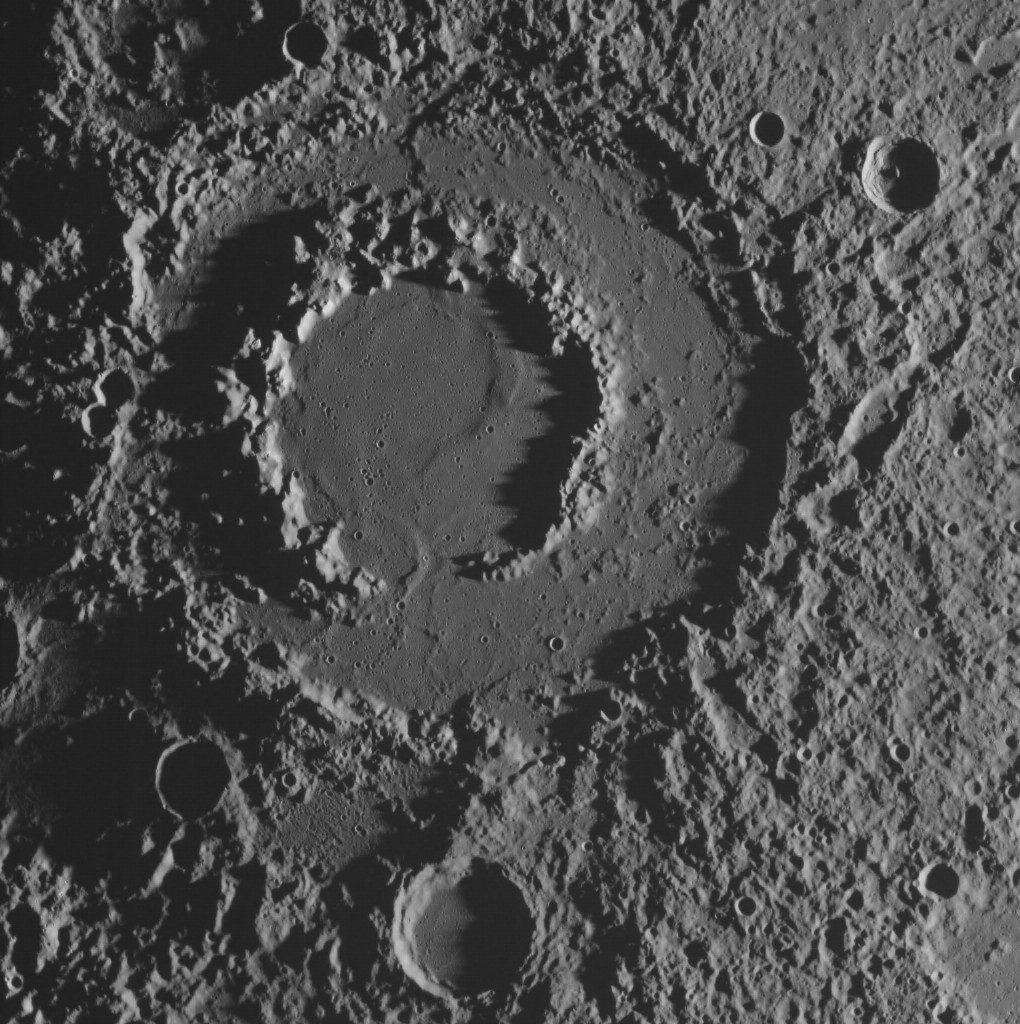
- MESSENGER WAC
- Feature type: Peak-ring impact basin
- Location: Beethoven quadrangle, Mercury
- Coordinates: 13.76°N 85.92°W
- Diameter: 213.0 km (132.4 mi)
- Eponym: Antonio Vivaldi

Vivaldi is a crater on Mercury. It was named by the IAU after Italian composer Antonio Vivaldi in 1976. It has a prominent and nearly continuous inner ring whose diameter measures about half that of the outer ring. It is one of 110 peak ring basins on Mercury. Unlike some of the lunar multiringed structures, no vestiges of additional rings are apparent around this crater. It is classified as c3 age.

A confirmed dark spot is present in along the northern peak ring. This dark spot is associated with hollows.

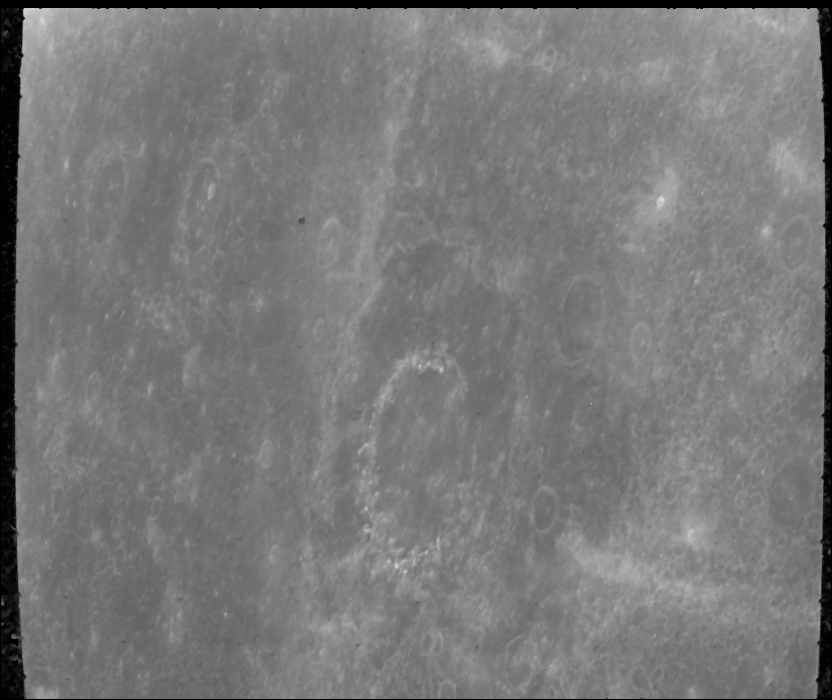
Mariner 10 image from 1974

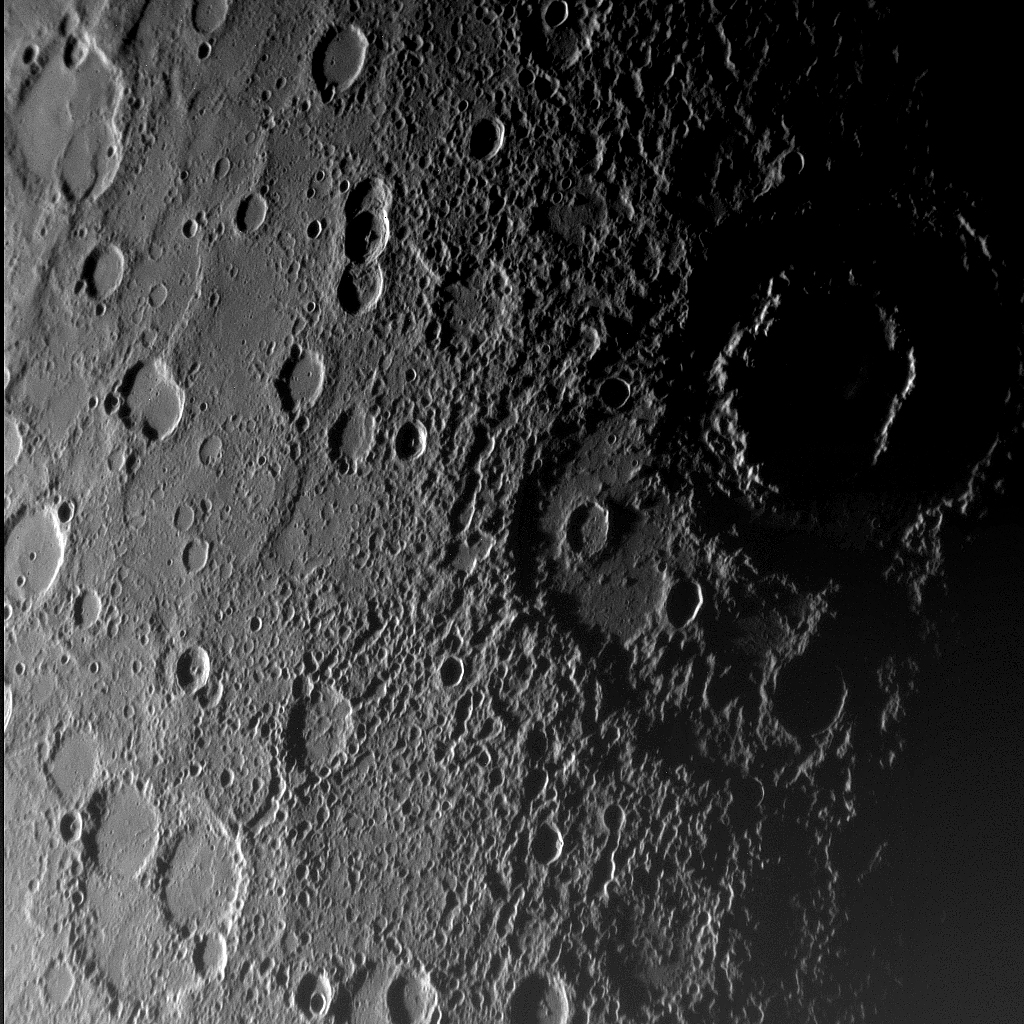
Vivaldi is the large, shadow-filled, double ringed crater to the upper right. From MESSENGER's first flyby in January 2008.

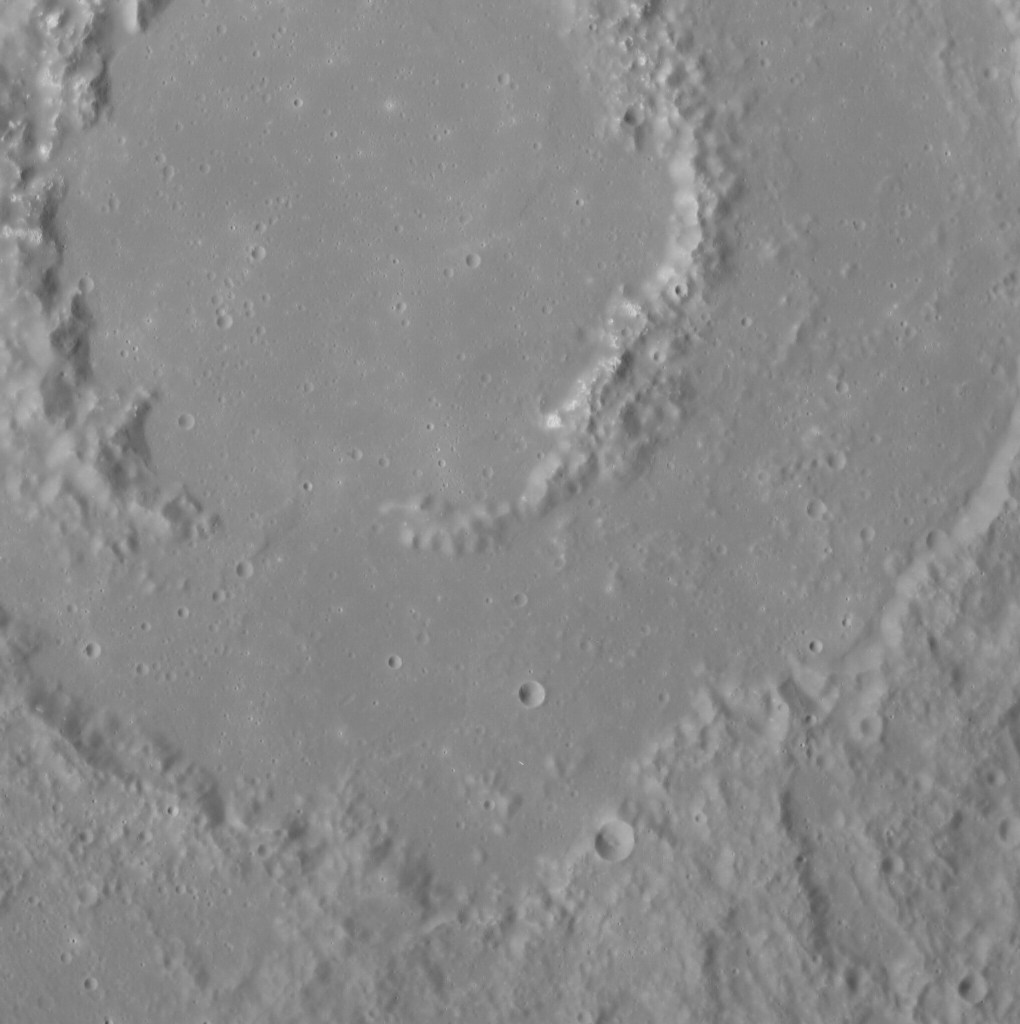
Interior of Vivaldi showing possible hollows on the peak ring.

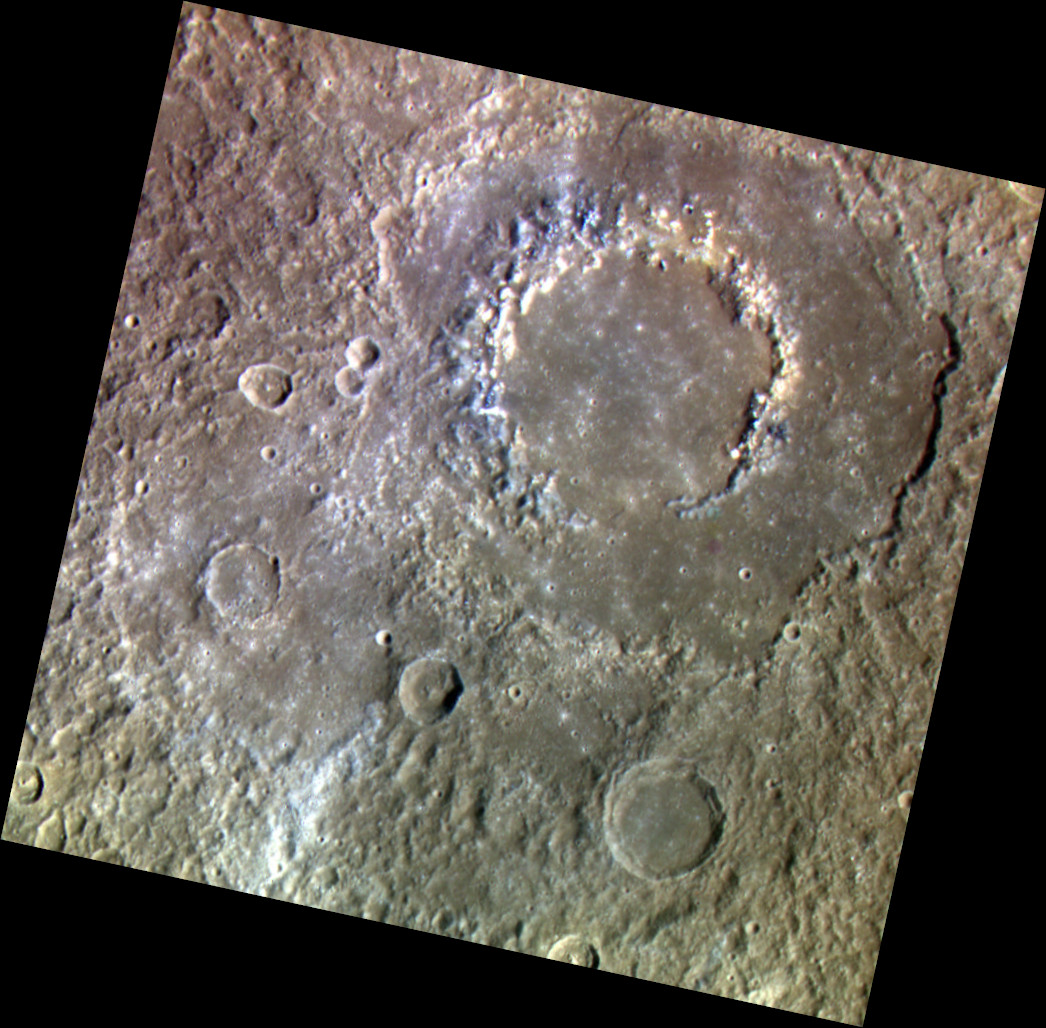
Exaggerated color image
