= Dürer (crater) =

Crater on Mercury

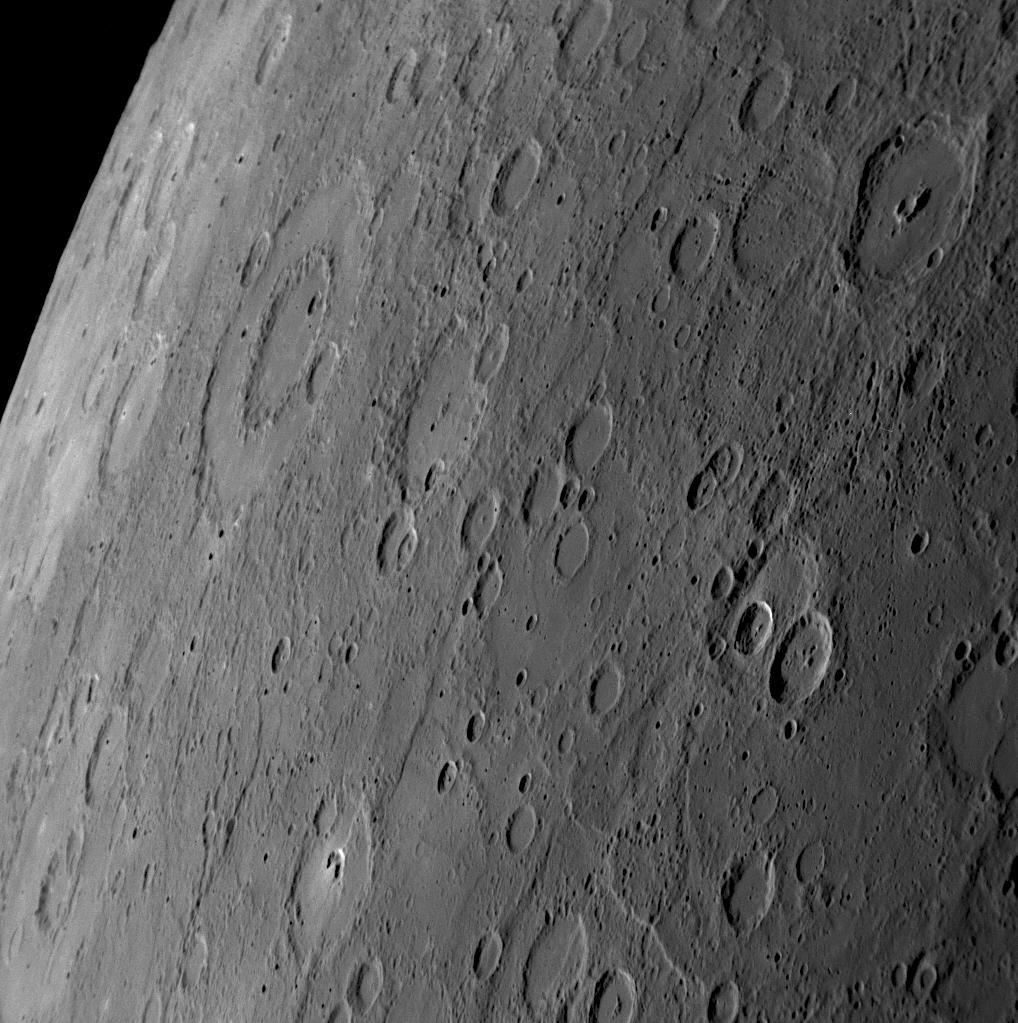
- Photo of Dürer crater (top left) by MESSENGER on its first flyby of Mercury in 2008
- Feature type: Peak-ring impact basin
- Location: Shakespeare quadrangle, Mercury
- Coordinates: 21.9°N 119.0°W
- Diameter: 195 km
- Eponym: Albrecht Dürer

Dürer is a crater on Mercury. It has a diameter of 195 kilometers. Its name was adopted by the International Astronomical Union (IAU) in 1976. Durer is named for the German artist Albrecht Dürer, who lived from 1471 to 1528.

Dürer is one of 110 peak ring basins on Mercury. Hollows are present within Dürer on and around the central peak ring.

Erté crater is north of Dürer, and Glinka is to the southeast.

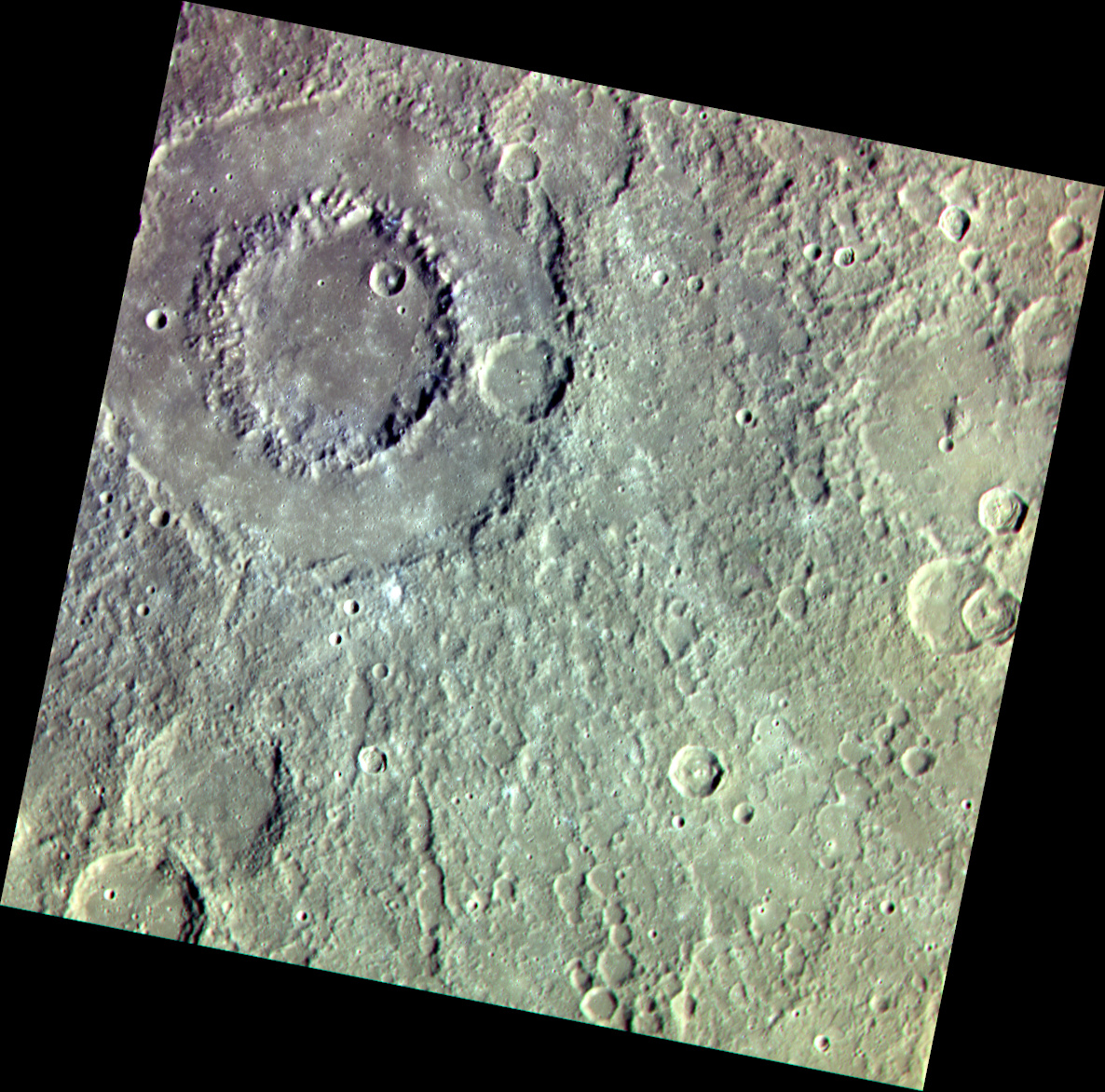
Approximate color image of Dürer crater

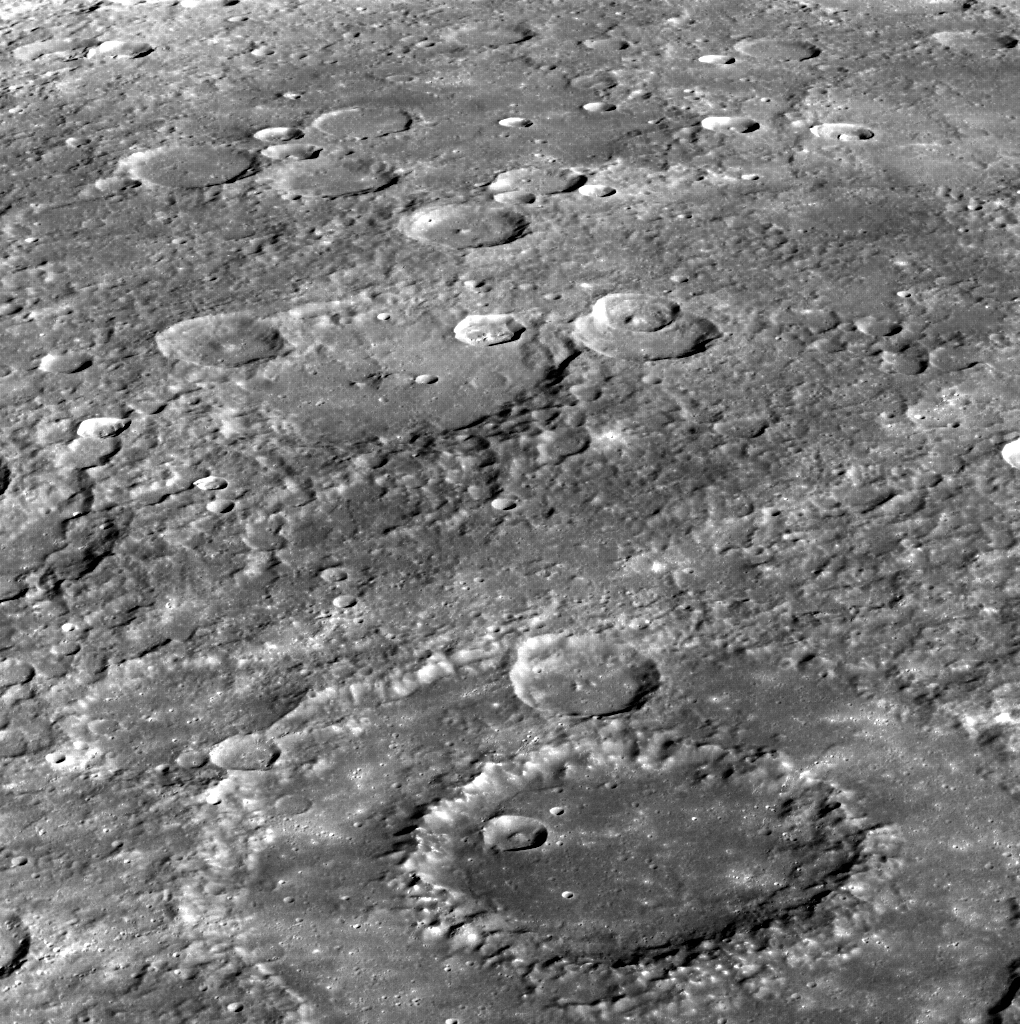
Another view from MESSENGER with Dürer in the foreground

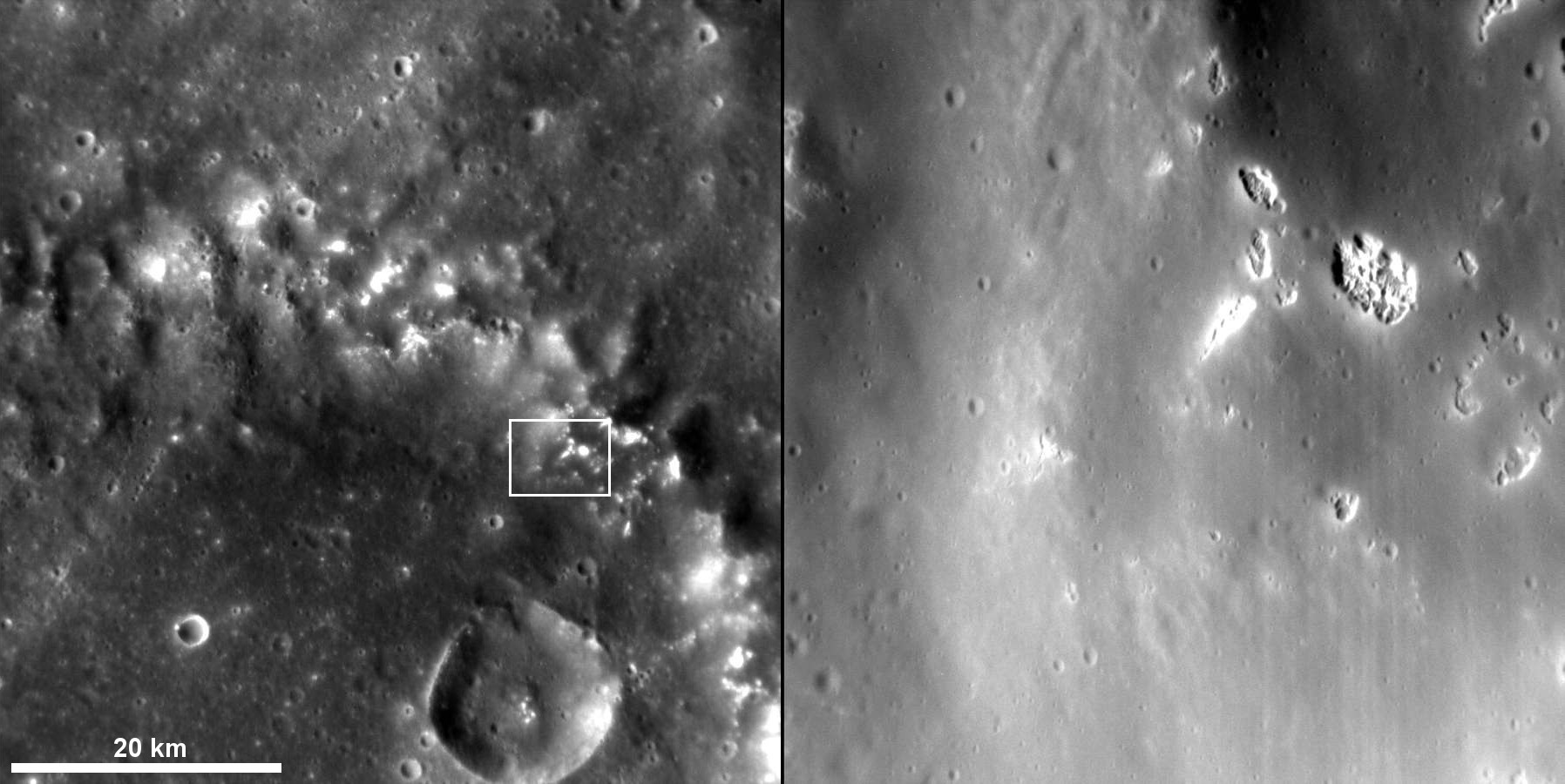
Detail of hollows in Dürer crater
