= Raphael (crater) =

Crater on Mercury

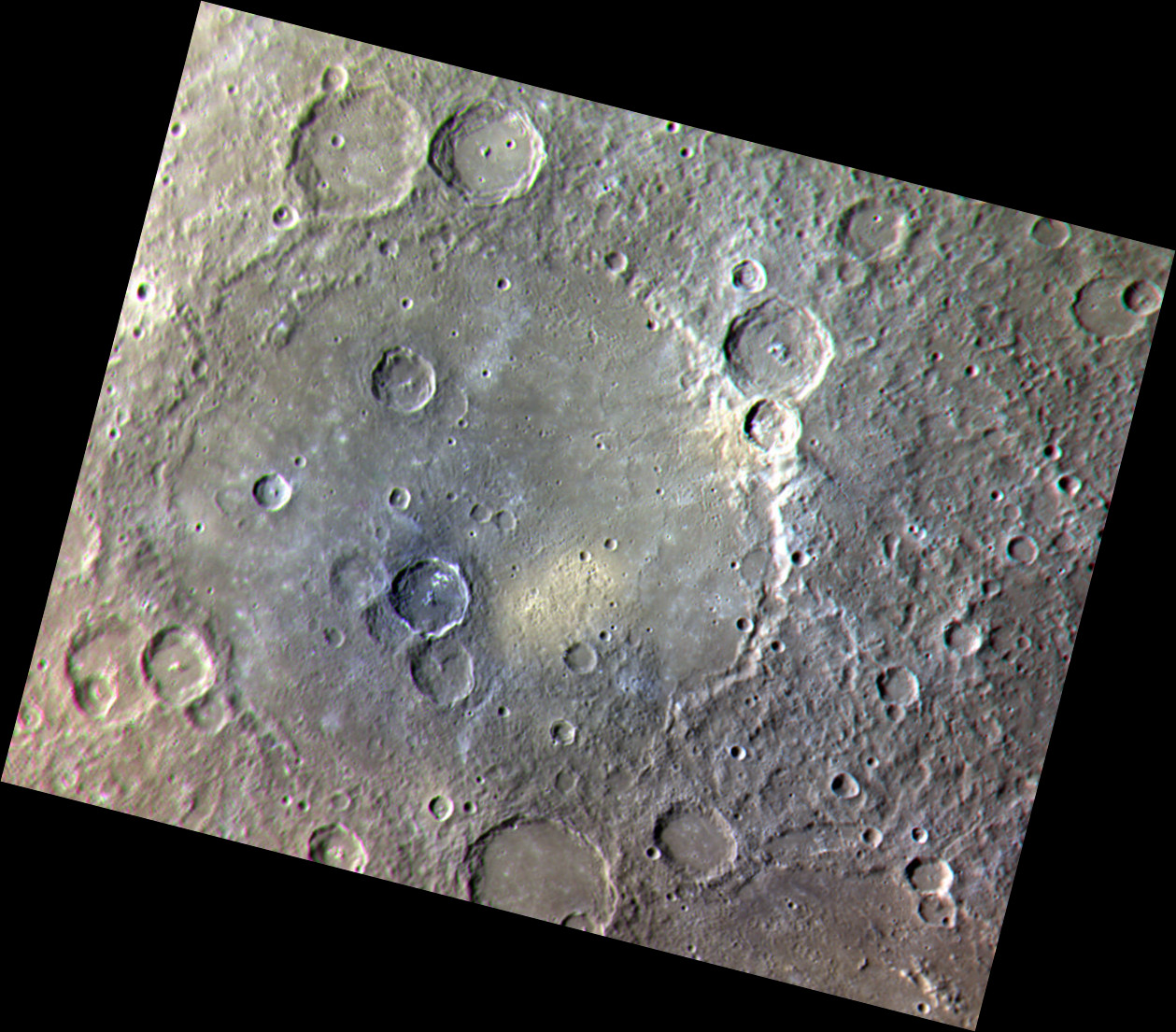
- MESSENGER approximate color image
- Feature type: Impact crater
- Location: Beethoven quadrangle, Mercury
- Coordinates: 20.42°S 76.35°W
- Diameter: 342 km (213 mi)
- Eponym: Raphael

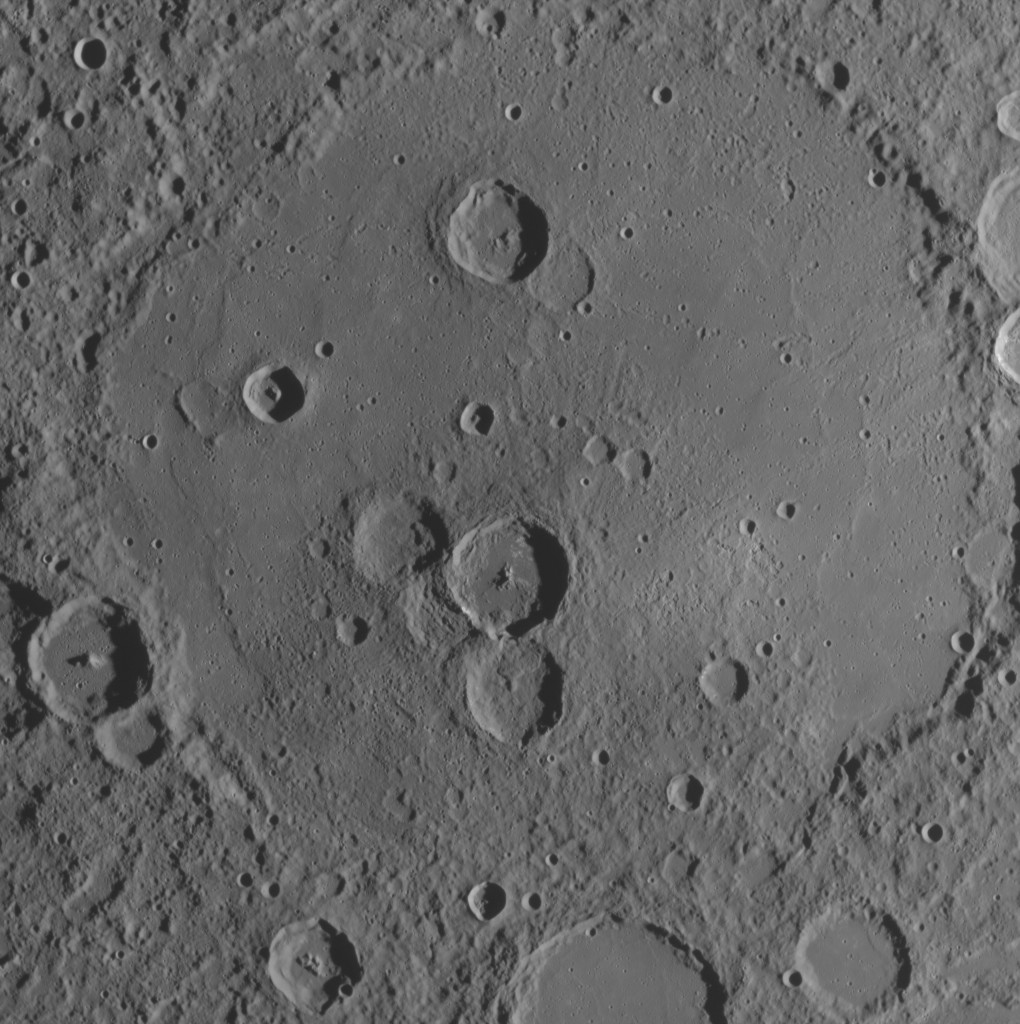
Another MESSENGER view

Raphael is a crater on Mercury. Its name was adopted by the International Astronomical Union (IAU) in 1976, and is named for the Italian painter Raphael (Raffaello Sanzio da Urbino). It is Tolstojan in age. The crater was first imaged by Mariner 10 in 1974.

Unlike other Mercurian craters of similar size, Raphael is not multi-ringed.

The crater Flaiano lies just south of the center of Raphael.

There is also a high-albedo area east of Flaiano, that is associated with irregular depressions. The area was named Madu Facula by the IAU in 2023. The depressions are similar to those within Navoi, Lermontov, Scarlatti, and Praxiteles. The depressions resemble those associated with volcanic explosions.

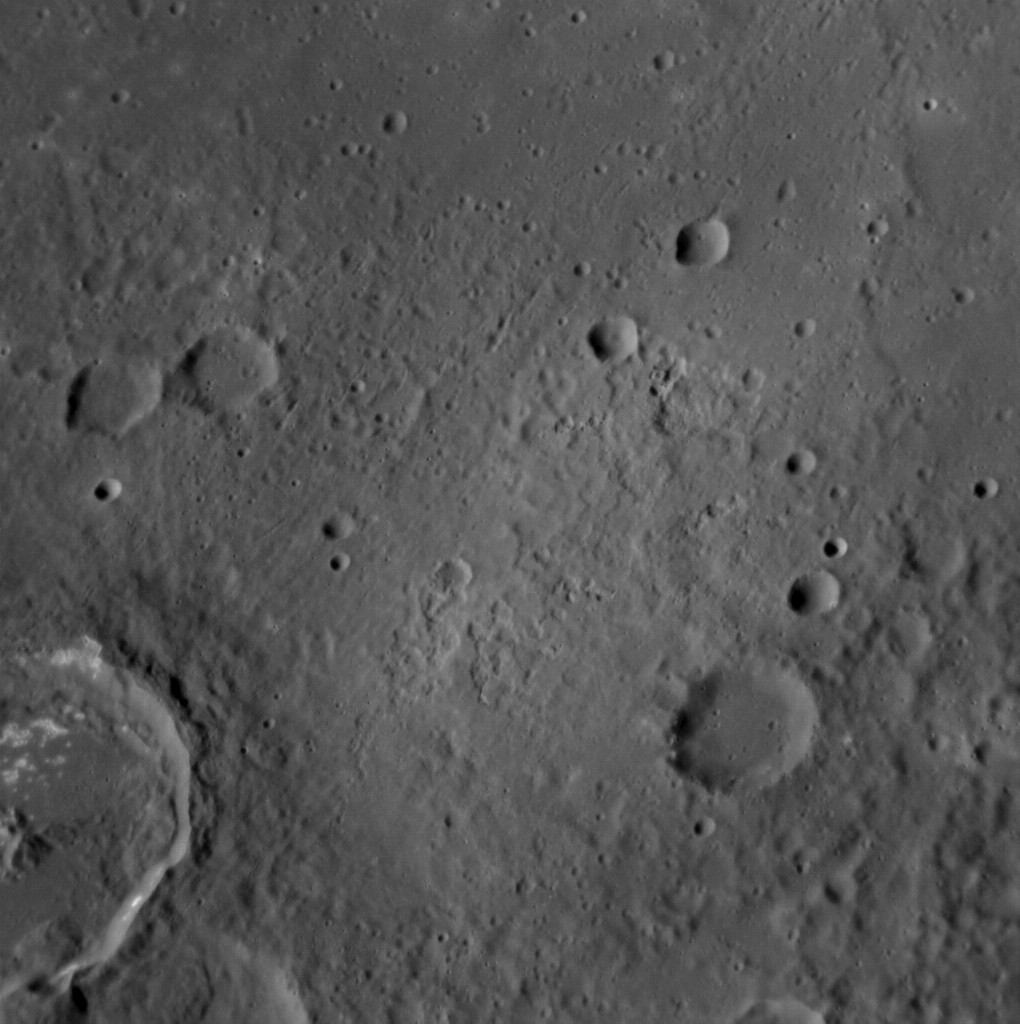
High-albedo area in Raphael crater, named Madu Facula
