= Chu Ta (crater) =

Crater on Mercury

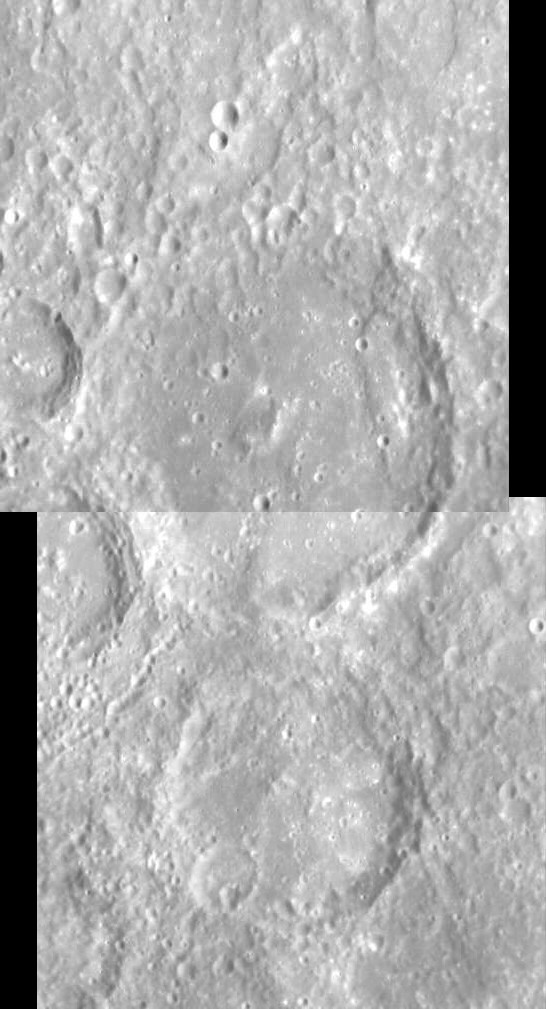
- MESSENGER mosaic
- Feature type: Impact crater
- Location: Beethoven quadrangle, Mercury
- Coordinates: 2.04°N 105.66°W
- Diameter: 100 km (62 mi)
- Eponym: Zhu Da

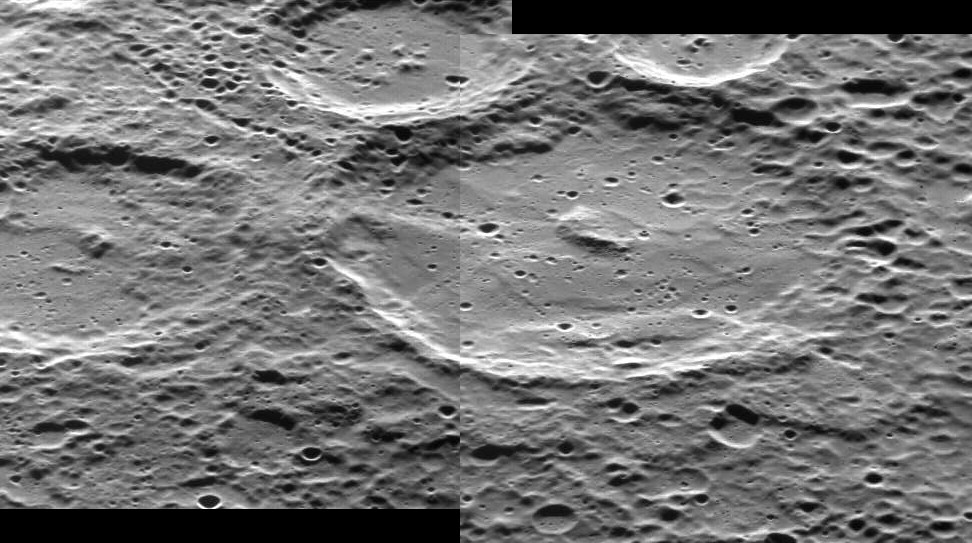
Oblique view

Chu Ta is a crater on Mercury. It has a diameter of 100 kilometers. Its name was adopted by the International Astronomical Union in 1976. Chu Ta is named for the Chinese painter Zhu Da, who lived from 1625 to 1705.

To the north of Chu Ta is the peak ring crater Wang Meng. To the southwest is Bilokur.
