= Flaiano (crater) =

Crater on Mercury

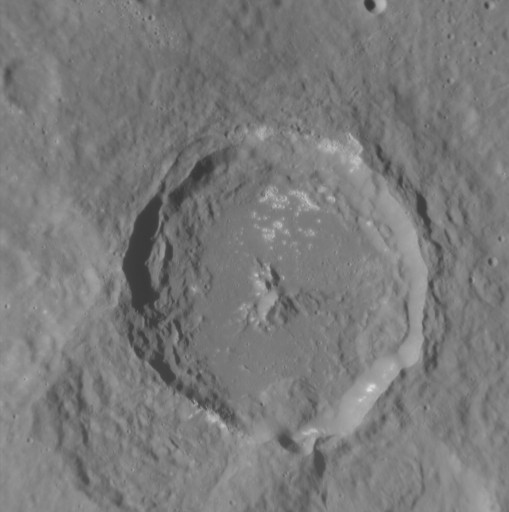
- MESSENGER image
- Feature type: Central-peak impact crater
- Location: Discovery quadrangle, Mercury
- Coordinates: 21.29°S 76.73°W
- Diameter: 43 km (27 mi)
- Eponym: Ennio Flaiano

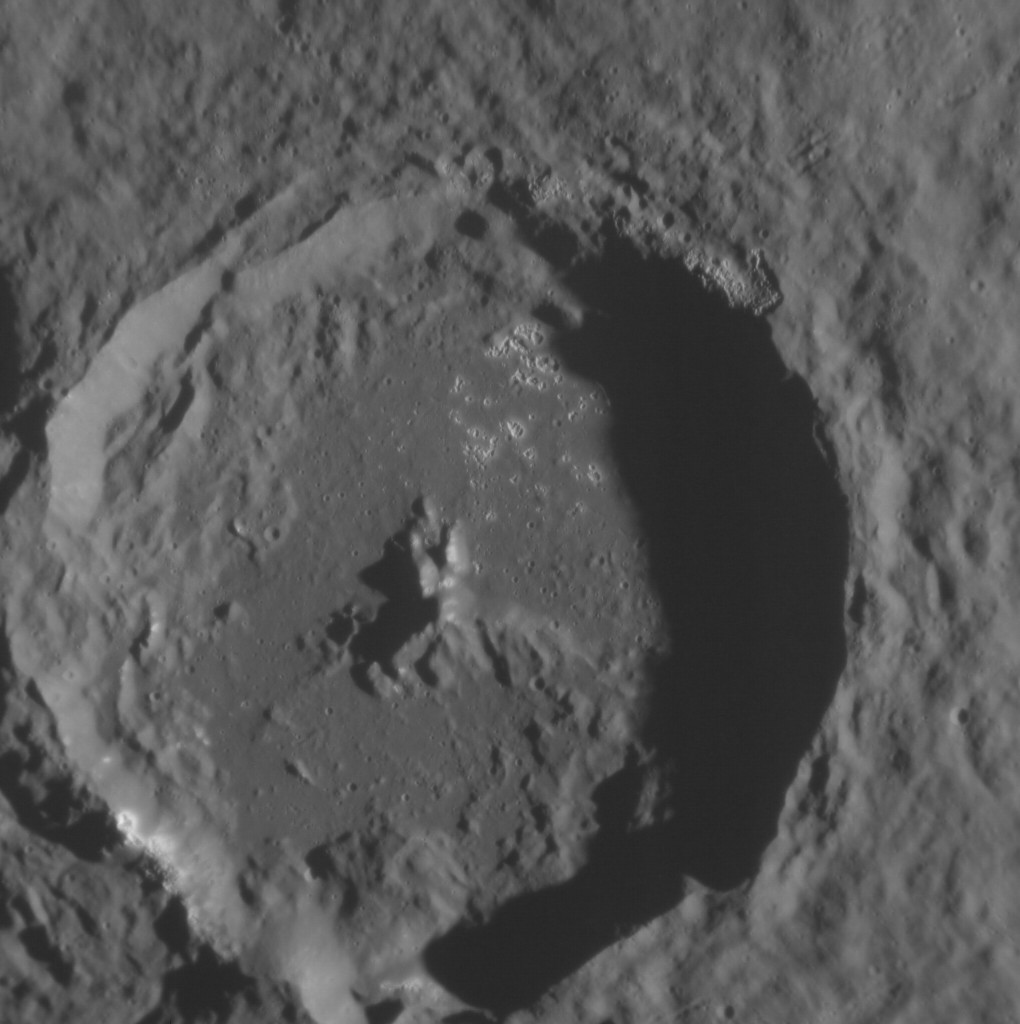
Another MESSENGER image

Flaiano is a crater on Mercury. It has a diameter of 43 kilometres (27 miles). Its name was adopted by the International Astronomical Union (IAU) on March 15, 2013. Flaiano is named for the Italian writer Ennio Flaiano. The crater was first imaged by Mariner 10 in 1974.

Hollows are present in the northeast quadrant of Flaiano.

Flaiano lies near the center of the Raphael basin, and is adjacent to an area of high albedo named Madu Facula by the IAU in 2023.
