= Erté (crater) =

Crater on Mercury

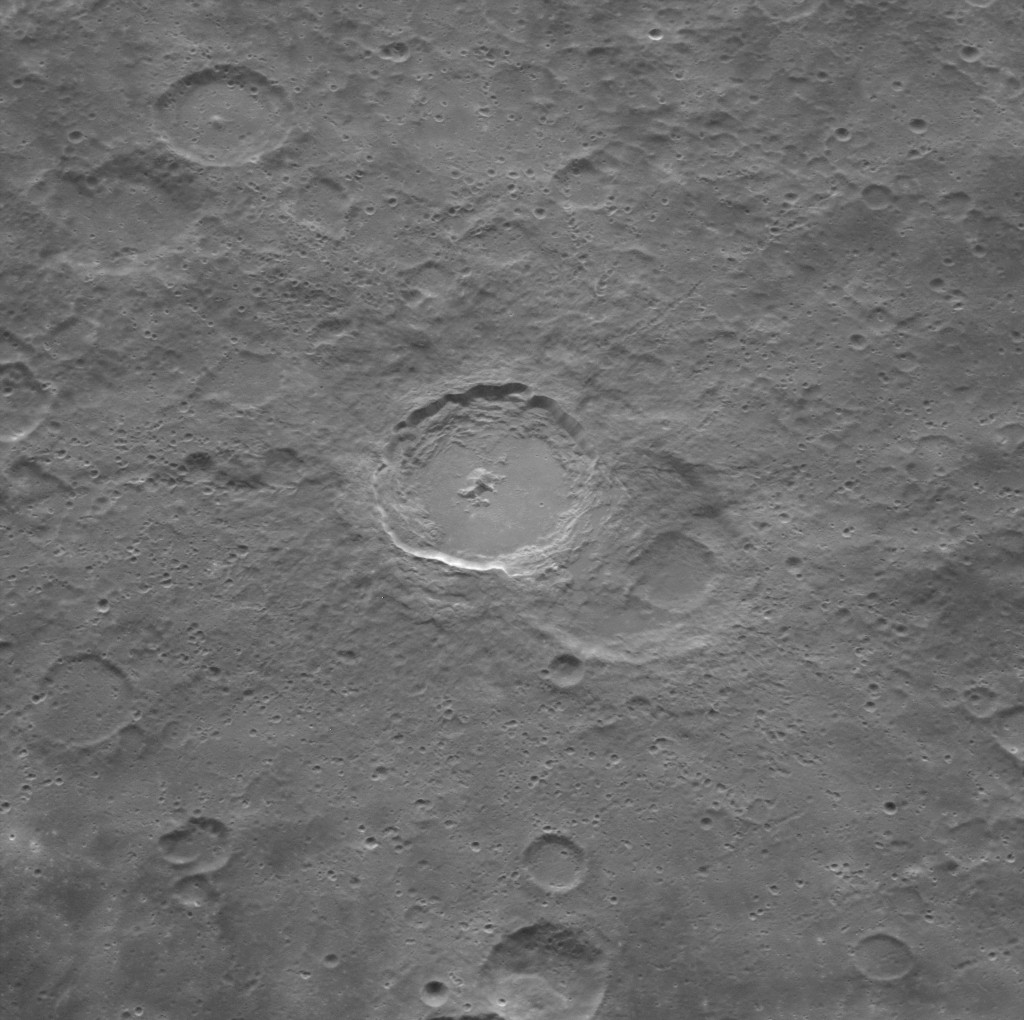
- MESSENGER WAC image of the bright Erté
- Feature type: Central-peak impact crater
- Location: Shakespeare quadrangle, Mercury
- Coordinates: 27.44°N 117.33°W
- Diameter: 48.5 km (30.1 mi)
- Eponym: Erté

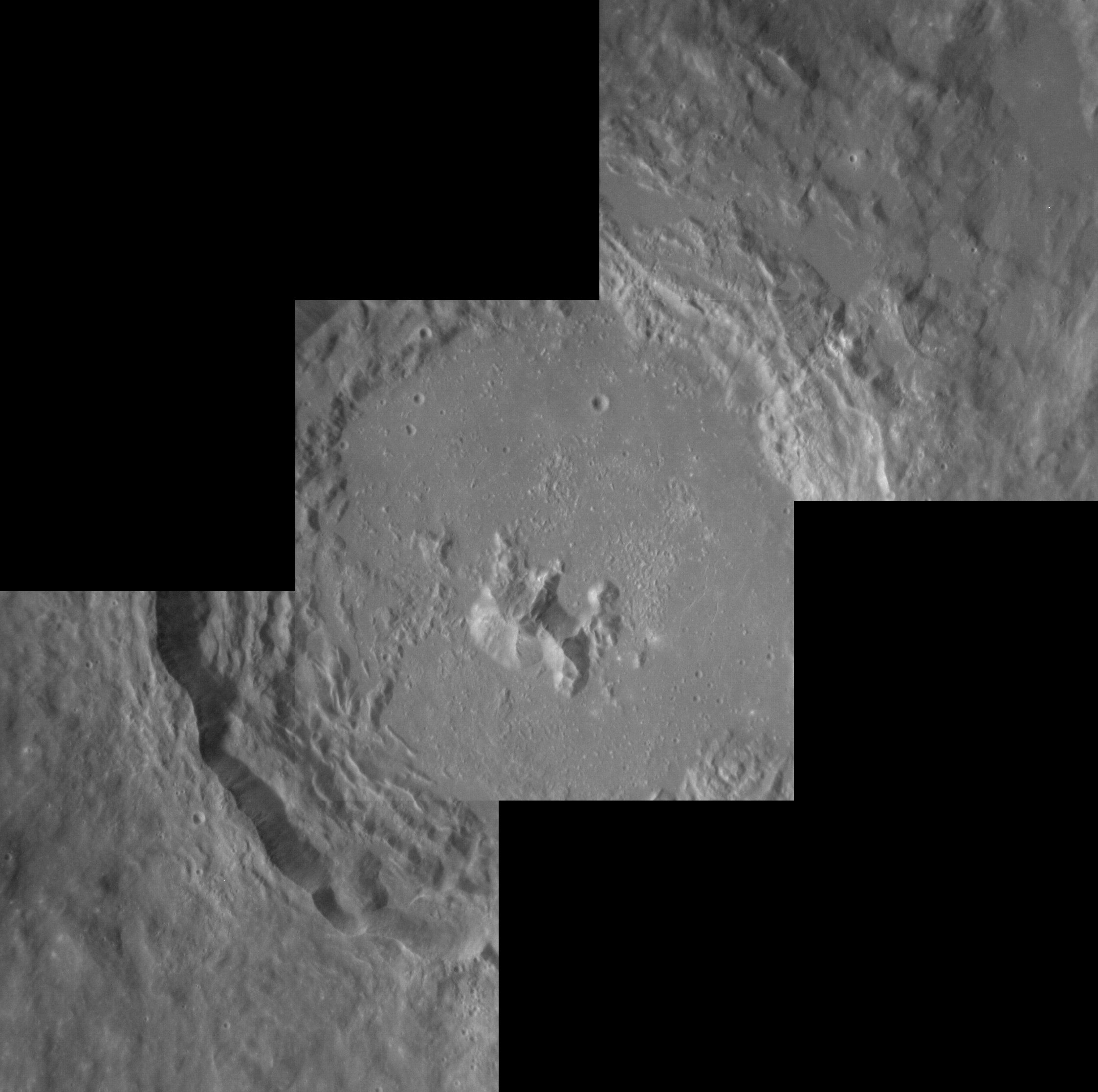
MESSENGER NAC mosaic

Erté is a crater on Mercury. Its name was adopted by the International Astronomical Union (IAU) in 2013. It is named for the artist and designer known as Erté.

Erté is one of the largest craters of the Kuiperian system on Mercury. The largest is Bartók crater.
