= Chiang Kʻui (crater) =

Crater on Mercury

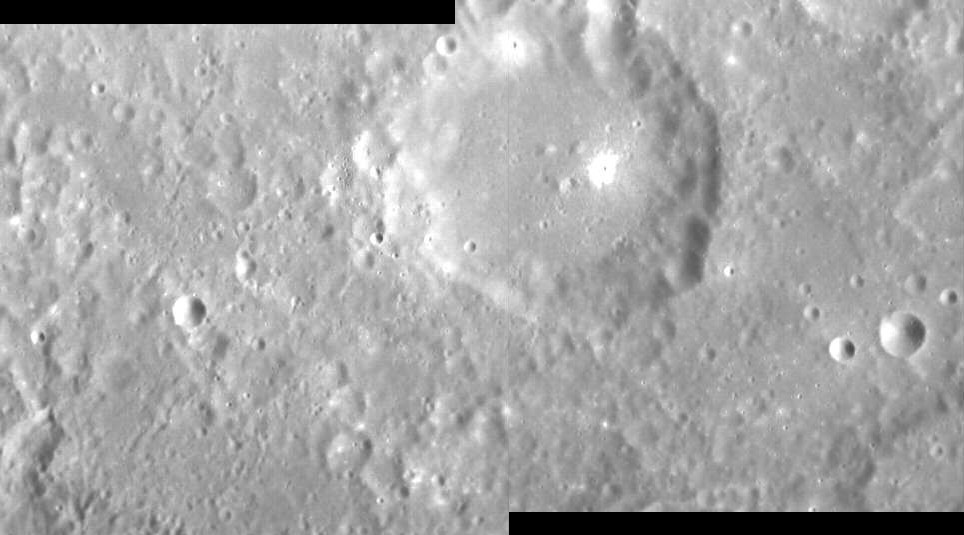
- MESSENGER mosaic
- Feature type: Impact crater
- Location: Beethoven quadrangle, Mercury
- Coordinates: 13.8°N 102.7°W
- Diameter: 41 km

Chiang Kʻui is a crater on Mercury. It has a diameter of 41 kilometers. Its name was adopted by the International Astronomical Union (IAU) in 1976. Chiang Kʻui is named for the Chinese composer Jiang Kui, who lived in the 12th century.
