= Mark Twain (crater) =

Crater on Mercury

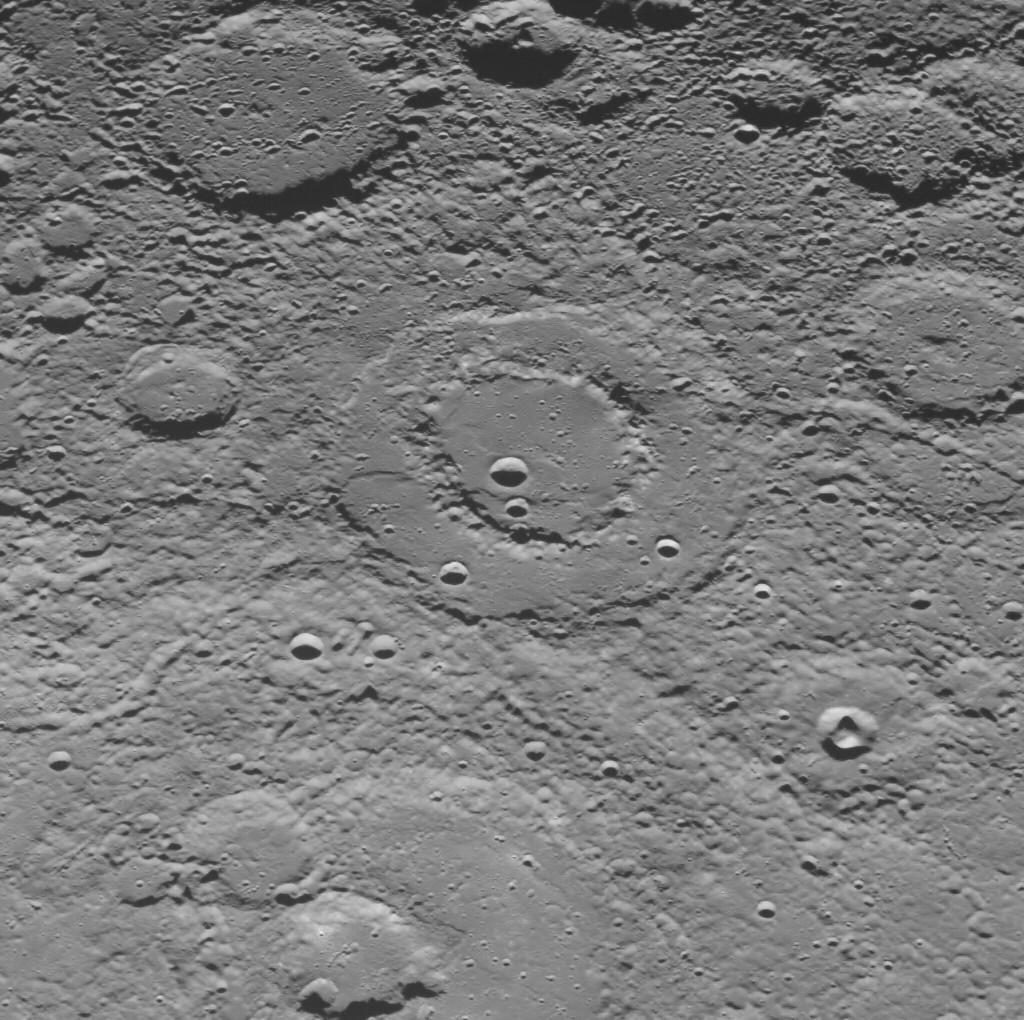
- MESSENGER WAC image, with Mark Twain at center
- Feature type: Peak-ring impact basin
- Location: Beethoven quadrangle, Mercury
- Coordinates: 10.91°S 138.28°W
- Diameter: 142 km (88 mi)
- Eponym: Mark Twain

Mark Twain is a crater on Mercury. Its name was adopted by the International Astronomical Union (IAU) in 1976. Mark Twain is named for the American author Mark Twain, who lived from 1835 to 1910.

Mark Twain is one of 110 peak ring basins on Mercury.

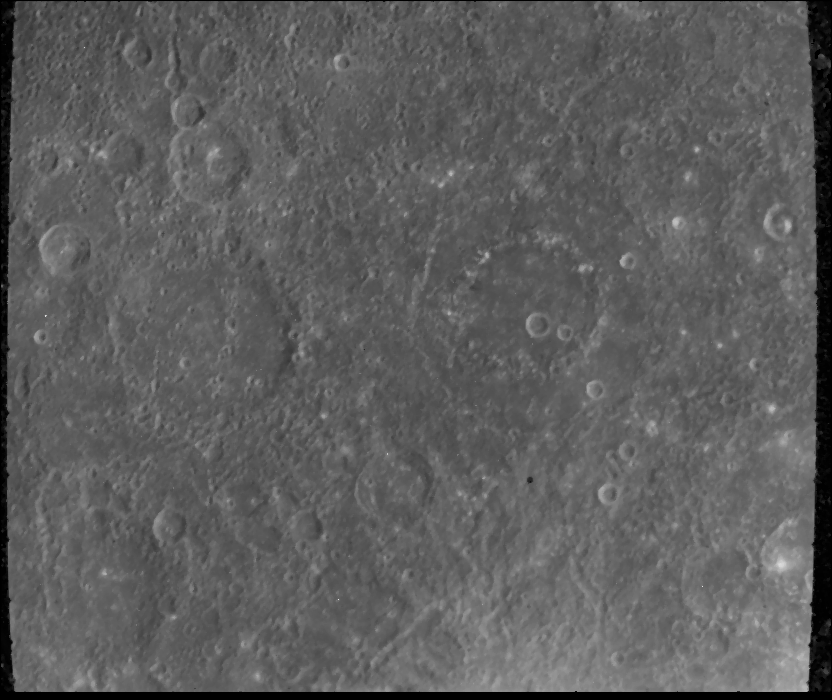
Mariner 10 image, with Mark Twain at right

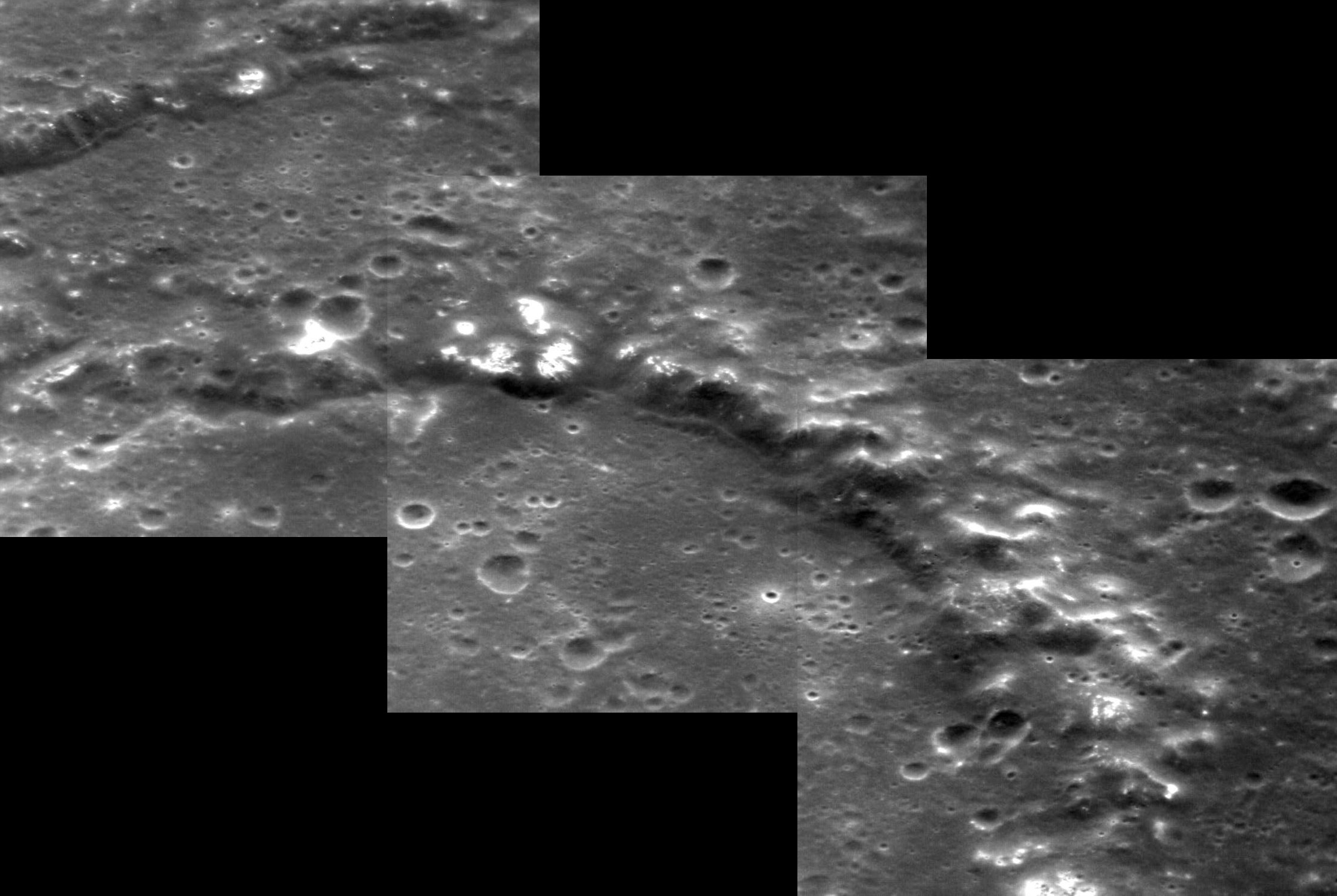
Interior of Mark Twain crater, showing hollows along the peak ring and outer rim
