= Beethoven quadrangle =

Quadrangle on Mercury

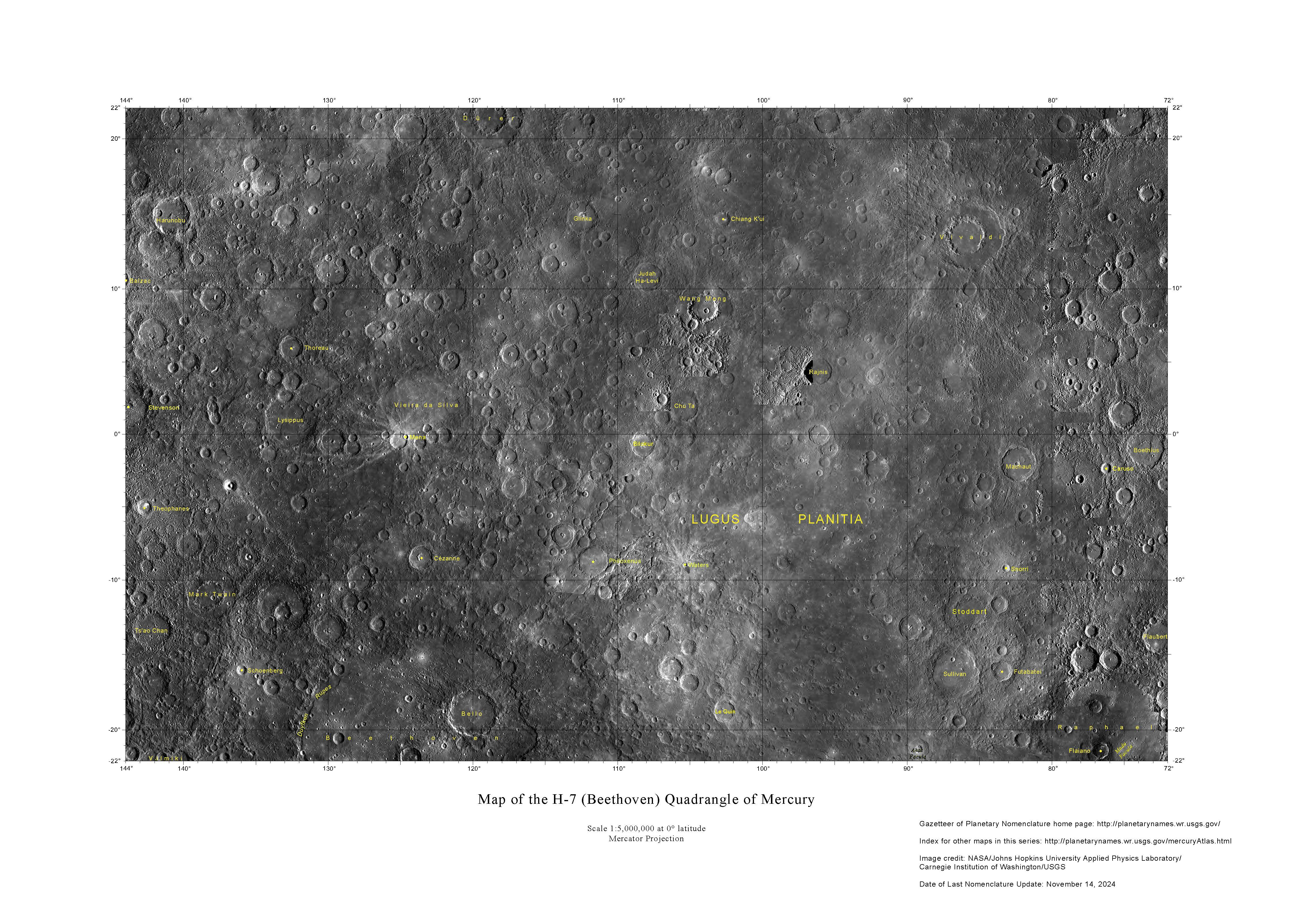
Beethoven quadrangle as mapped by the MESSENGER spacecraft (2024)

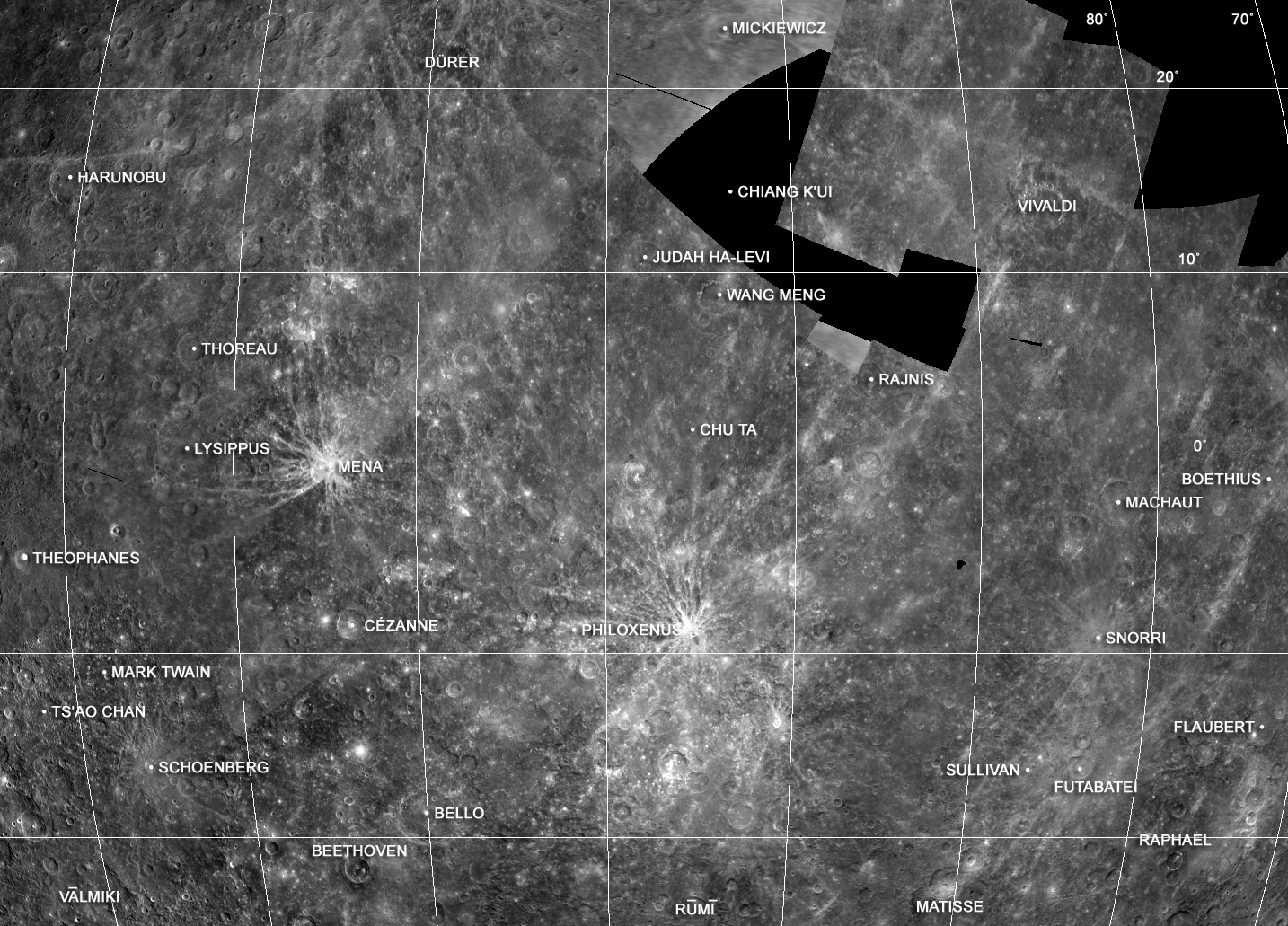
Mariner 10 photomosaic (1975)

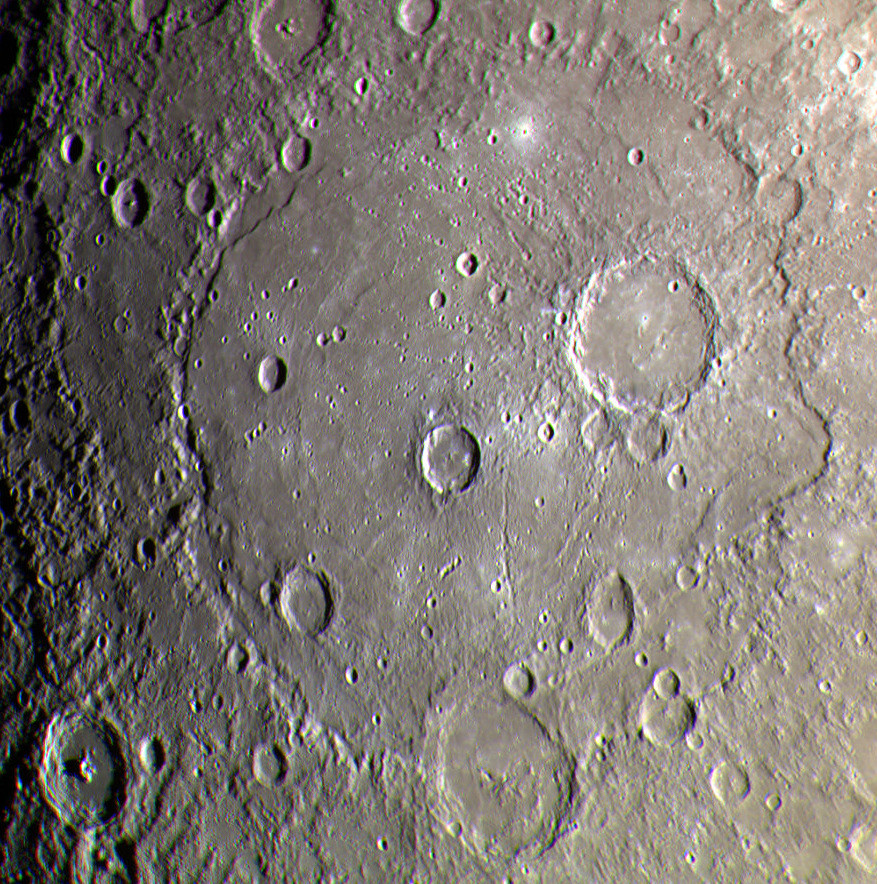
Oblique, exaggerated color image of Beethoven

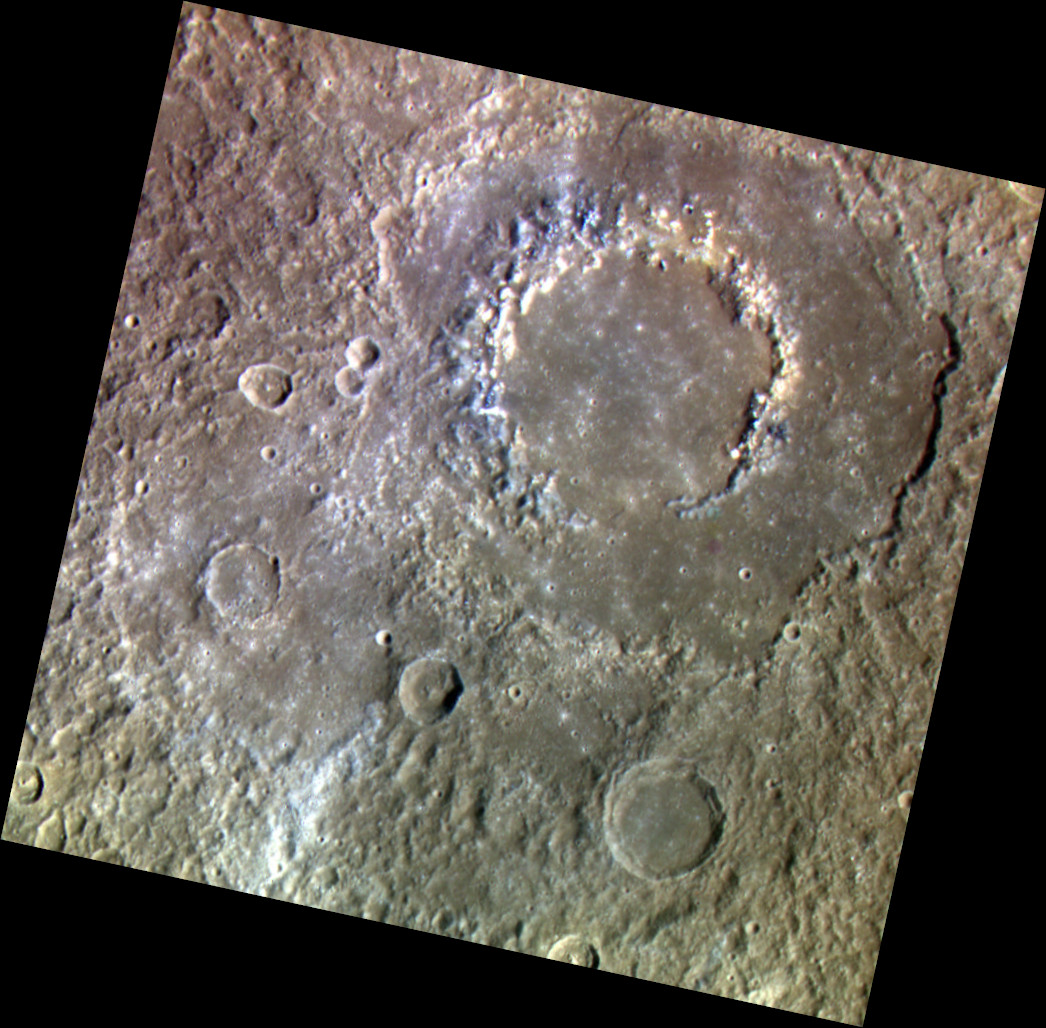
Exaggerated color image of Vivaldi, in the northeaster part of the quadrangle

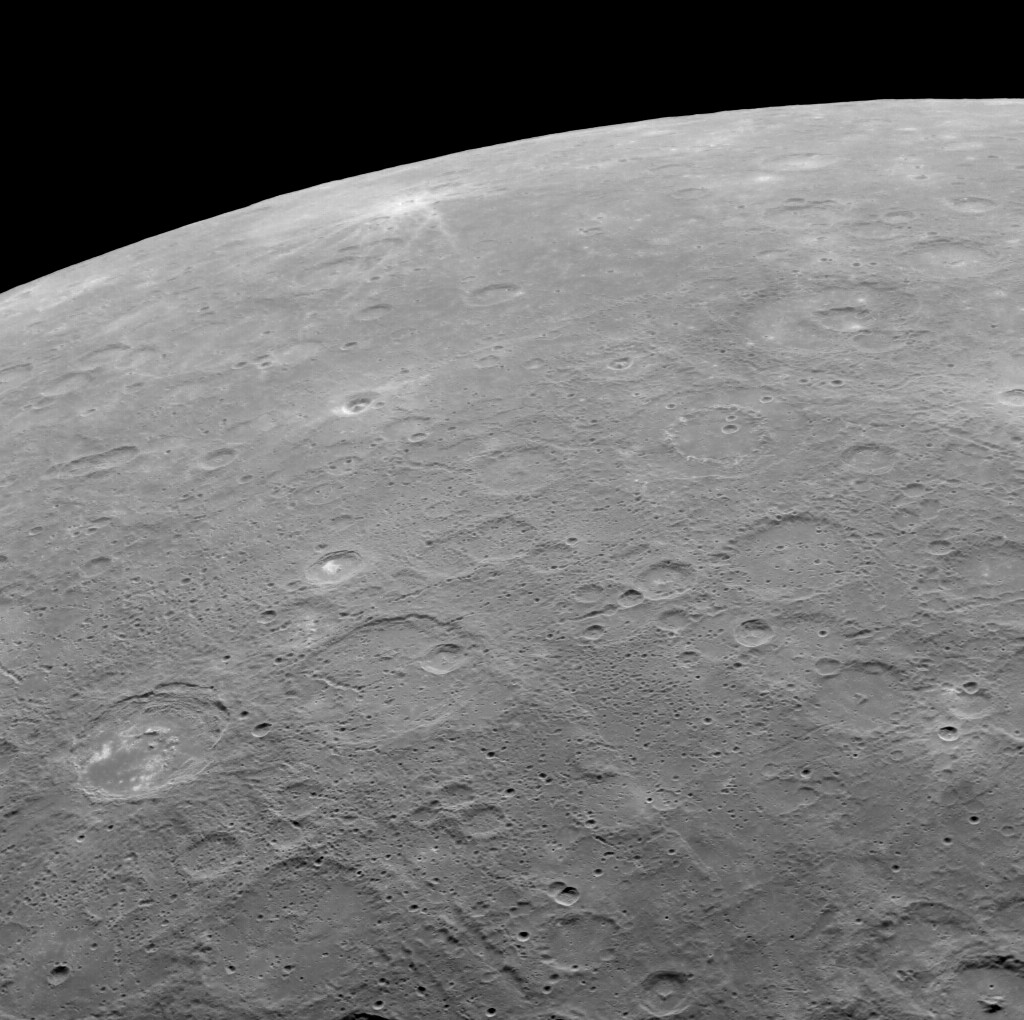
Part of western Beethoven quadrangle is shown beyond the foreground, including Theophanes, Lysippus, Mark Twain, and Mena craters.

The Beethoven quadrangle is located in the equatorial region of Mercury, in the center of the area imaged by Mariner 10. Most pictures of the quadrangle were obtained at high sun angles as the Mariner 10 spacecraft receded from the planet. Geologic map units are described and classified on the basis of morphology, texture, and albedo, and they are assigned relative ages based on stratigraphic relations and on visual comparisons of the density of superposed craters. Crater ages are established by relative freshness of appearance, as indicated by topographic sharpness of their rim crests and degree of preservation of interior and exterior features such as crater floors, walls, and ejecta aprons. Generally, topography appears highly subdued because of the sun angle, and boundaries between map units are not clearly defined.

Impact craters larger than about 250 km are referred to as basins. Unlike many basins on the Moon, however, the two obvious basins in the quadrangle, Beethoven (610 km in diameter) and Raphael (320 km in diameter), are not multiringed, whereas well-developed rings encircle many craters of lesser diameters. Remnant ejecta blankets around parts of the Beethoven and Raphael basins are subdued in appearance and their margins poorly defined in places. However, where they can be recognized, these extensive aprons allow a generalized regional stratigraphic sequence to be determined. A third basin, extremely subdued but probable, is centered at latitude 0°, longitude 130°.

Tolstoj quadrangle is to the west of Beethoven quadrangle, and Kuiper quadrangle is to the east. Shakespeare quadrangle and Victoria quadrangle are to the northwest and northeast, and Michelangelo quadrangle and Discovery quadrangle are to the southwest and southeast.

== Stratigraphy ==
=== Plains materials ===
Major divisions of rock units in the quadrangle are (1) plains materials and (2) crater and basin materials. Surfaces of the plains units range in morphology from relatively level but rough to nearly flat and smooth; the latter terrain has intermediate albedo like that of the Cayley Formation or older maria on the Moon. Plains materials are identified in part by surface texture and their relative ages determined by density of superposed craters. Intercrater plains material, one of the two oldest plains units, was originally described by Trask and Guest. It covers large areas in the western, central, and southeastern parts of the quadrangle. There, as in other regions of Mercury, its surface reveals the outlines of many buried crater rim crests and knobby remnants of an older resurfaced terra. This unit has been scoured by many secondary craters that have formed overlapping chains and troughs that contribute to its hummocky texture. The intercrater plains unit is inferred to consist of crater and basin ejecta deposits, volcanic flows, and possible pyroclastic deposits that have partly resurfaced and smoothed older, highly cratered, crustal rocks. The unit appears to be gradational laterally eastward with plains and terra material, undivided, and vertically with intermediate plains material. The intercrater plains material is probably about the same age as the ejecta blanket around Beethoven basin: both units have a high crater density. That the plains unit is younger than Beethoven may be indicated in some areas where the basin's ejecta blanket appears to be partly obscured by the overlap or embayment of plains material. Spudis and Prosser (1984) have suggested that Beethoven may possibly be late c3 in age or as old as early c2.

The age of the plains and terra material, undivided is probably equivalent to that of the intercrater plains material, and to at least part of the intermediate plains material, though it was not found in contact with the latter. The plains and terra unit, occurring in the central and eastern parts of the quadrangle, was originally mapped to the east in the Kuiper quadrangle (De Hon and others, 1981). The term was there applied where differences in image quality prevent clear distinctions between plains and terra materials. The name was adopted in the Beethoven quadrangle for the same reason. The unit intergrades to the west and south with intercrater plains material and is interpreted to be of the same origin and composition.

The intermediate plains material and smooth plains material probably also consist of mixtures of relatively fine crater ejecta and volcanic materials that appear to form a continuous sequence. Both units are thicker than the intercrater plains unit. The intermediate plains material is widespread in intercrater areas in the west half of the quadrangle and fills floors of older craters and basins in the southern part. Smooth plains material, the youngest plains unit, occurs as scattered patches in low areas and covers the floors of many craters of c4 age and older. In some crater floors, especially smaller ones, differentiation between smooth plains and intermediate plains materials is difficult and the choice becomes arbitrary.

Aside from a few small patches of dark material, and areas covered by bright rays around and emanating from c5 craters, all plains units and the exterior rim materials of many craters have albedos in the intermediate range. Collectively, these materials impart a homogeneous appearance to the surface of the planet that is unlike the contrast in bright highlands and dark maria of the Moon.

No terra material similar to that in the Kuiper quadrangle (De Hon and others, 1981) was recognized in the Beethoven quadrangle. Its absence may be due, in part, to fewer clusters of large young craters whose coalesced ejecta blankets could have yielded the coarsely textured, rough surfaces that characterize the unit in the Kuiper area. Also, the visible effect of roughness is diminished by the higher sun angle at which the Beethoven images were acquired.

=== Basin and crater materials ===
Coarsely lineated ejecta blankets from Beethoven and Raphael basins dominate the southern part of the map area. The crater wall of Beethoven is buried by its ejecta blanket and by plains materials. Although the ejecta blankets from both basins are extensive, they are highly asymmetrical and deeply embayed in places by intercrater plains and younger plains units. These embayment relations, together with the discontinuous and subdued appearance of the rim crests and interior walls of the basins, suggest that they are relatively old impact structures. Morphologic appearances may be misleading on Mercury, however, because of the planet's high temperature and gravity field compared with, for example, those of the Moon. Both of these conditions may promote, particularly on large structures, more rapid isostatic adjustments that would be expressed by subdued topography and the premature “aging” of once-large topographic features. Crater counts, on the other hand, tend to support observed stratigraphic relations.

In addition to the large single-ringed basins of Beethoven and Raphael, at least eight double-ringed craters exceeding 100 km in diameter occur in the quadrangle. These craters range in age from c1 to c3 and, on a minor scale, their ejecta blankets provide stratigraphic horizons useful for the relative dating of material units in their vicinity. Two of the youngest of the double-ringed craters, Durer (lat 22° N., long 119°) and Vivaldi (lat 14° N., long 86°), have prominent and nearly continuous inner rings whose diameters measure about half that of their outer rings. Unlike some of the lunar multiringed structures, no vestiges of additional rings are apparent around these craters.

Central peaks are common within craters of c3 and c4 age, rare in craters of c2 age. Their origin may be genetically related to the inner rings of larger craters and basins. Crater floors are underlain by a zone of shattered and brecciated material formed by the shock wave resulting from impact. Crater-rim material consists of decompressed ejecta from the impact, whereas central peaks were probably formed by the converging flow of slump material from the crater walls (Shoemaker, 1981). If a crater was sufficiently large, the converging flow resulted in an inner ring rather than a central peak. An alternative model for central ring or peak formation was discussed by Melosh (1983), who suggested that they form as a result of rebound of fractured material analogous to the jet produced by a stone dropped into water. Depending on the size of the crater, the result is either a central peak or an inner ring. The limiting crater size for central peaks has been defined by Guest and others (1979, p. 88) as about 150 km. This size limit seems to be generally applicable in the Beethoven quadrangle with the exception of the ringed crater Judah Ha-Levi (lat 11° N., long 109°), which has an inner rim-crest diameter of about 80 km. Although this crater appears to have two rings, its inner ring structure is morphologically fresher than the outer ring, and it may have been formed by a separate and later impact.

Craters less than about 30 km in diameter were not mapped except for those that are rayed and those occurring in chains and clusters satellitic to larger craters and basins. These satellitic or secondary craters are not distinguished as to relative age or origin. (However, near the southwest map corner, elongate chains are radial to their parent crater Valmiki). In general, secondary craters appear topographically fresher and occur closer to their primary sources than do their lunar counterparts. This effect is probably because the higher gravity field on Mercury compared to the Moon has resulted in higher impact velocities for crater ejecta (Scott, 1977).

== Structure ==
Neither faults nor scarps that are possibly associated with faults or monoclinal folding appear to be common in the Beethoven quadrangle, possibly because of the high sun elevation. The longest and most prominent of these structures occur in the plains and terra material, undivided, in the southeast quadrant of the map area. There, a series of prominent scarps extends northeast from near latitude 10° S., longitude 95° to latitude 4° S., longitude 86°, over a distance of about 400 km. The inner ring of crater Durer appears to be slightly offset on the north side by a small normal or strike-slip fault.

Troughs and ridges are present throughout the quadrangle. Where the troughs are not clearly radial to crater or basin centers, they may be grabens; however, in most places they are difficult to distinguish from linear gouges produced by impact ejecta at low-angle ballistic trajectories. Some ridges resemble those on the lunar maria, but generally they are less sharply defined. Ridges interpreted to be buried rim crests of two ancient basins are partly visible almost due north of Beethoven basin; the probable centers of the basins are near latitude 11° S., longitude 127° and latitude 2° N., longitude 124°.

== Geologic history ==
Geologic evidence for the reconstruction of the evolutionary history of Mercury is less complete than for the Moon and Mars, for which orbiting spacecraft and landers have provided total or near-total coverage and high-resolution images. However, available data allow certain parallels to be drawn with respect to the bombardment and accretionary histories of the three bodies. The geologic record shows a period of decreasing meteoroid flux on all three, wherein the basins and large craters formed early in their crustal evolution were superseded by impacts of progressively smaller size. The relative paucity of mappable c5 craters in the Beethoven quadrangle is indicative of the decreasing crater-production rate in the younger crater classes. The low density of small craters in the oldest class, c1, results from their destruction by impacts and obscuration by ejecta and volcanic material over a long period of mercurian history.

The intercrater plains and younger plains materials probably have mixed origins, and they consist of both volcanic and impact ejecta-related deposits. The plains materials accumulated mostly in low-lying areas and have buried or partly buried older craters and surfaces. Their relative ages and thicknesses are reflected by the number of craters visible on their surfaces: where crater densities are high, the plains material is relatively old or thin; low crater densities indicate relatively thick, young deposits. Where superposed craters can be distinguished from partly buried craters, relative ages of the plains units can be established. Crater counts indicate that the intercrater plans unit, whose crater density is twice that of the intermediate plains unit, is significantly older.

Whether the mercurian plains materials are analogous to volcanic flows of the lunar maria is unknown. In this quadrangle, the former lack many characteristics of mare materials, including low albedo and strong albedo contrasts with other units, lobate flow fronts, sinuous rilles, and numerous wrinkle ridges and domes with summit craters. Possibly the plains units on Mercury are similar to the Cayley Formation on the Moon and consist largely of finely divided ejecta materials. Whatever the origin and composition of the plains units in the Beethoven quadrangle, they represent late stages in the crustal evolution of this region.

Other differences between the Moon and that part of Mercury observed in this quadrangle are the absence in Beethoven of distinct highlands and lowlands, as well as the preservation in the quadrangle of secondary crater chains around older craters and basins (Scott, 1977).

The geologic history of Mercury has been summarized by Guest and O'Donnell (1977), Davies and others, and Strom.

== Sources ==
- King, John S.; David H. Scott (1990). "Geologic Map Of The Beethoven (H-7) Quadrangle Of Mercury" (PDF). Prepared for the National Aeronautics and Space Administration by the U.S. Department of the Interior, U.S. Geological Survey. Published in hardcopy as USGS Miscellaneous Investigations Series Map I–2048, as part of the Atlas of Mercury, 1:5,000,000 Geologic Series. Hardcopy is available for sale from U.S. Geological Survey, Information Services, Box 25286, Federal Center, Denver, CO 80225

== Bibliography ==
- De Hon, R.A., Scott, D.H., and Underwood, J.R., Jr., 1981, Geologic map of the Kuiper quadrangle of Mercury: U.S. Geological Survey Miscellaneous Investigations Series Map I-1233, scale 1:5,000,000.
- Guest, J.E., Butterworth, Paul, Murray, John, and O'Donnell, W.P., 1979, Planetary Geology: New York, John Wiley, 208 p.
- Guest, J.E., and O'Donnell, W.P., 1977, Surface history of Mercury: A review: Vistas in Astronomy, v. 20, p. 273–300.
- International Astronomical Union, 1977, Working Group for Planetary System Nomenclature, in 16th General Assembly, Grenoble, 1976, Proceedings: International Astronomical Union Transactions, v. 16B, p. 330–333, 351–355.
- McCauley, J.F., Guest, J.E., Schaber, G.G., Trask, N.J., and Greeley, Ronald, 1981, Stratigraphy of the Caloris basin, Mercury: Icarus, v. 47, no. 2, p. 184–202.
- Melosh, H.J., 1983, Acoustic fluidization: American Scientist, v. 71, p. 158–165.
- Scott, D.H., 1977, Moon-Mercury: Relative preservation states of secondary craters: Physics of the Earth and Planetary Interiors, v. 15, no. 2–3, p. 173– 178.
- Shoemaker, E.M., 1981, The collision of solid bodies, in Beatty, J.K., O'Leary, Brian, and Chaikin, eds., The New Solar System: Cambridge, Mass., Sky Publishing Co., p. 33–44.
- Spudis, P.D., and Prosser, J.G., 1984, Geologic map of the Michelangelo quadrangle of Mercury: U.S. Geological Survey Miscellaneous Investigations Series Map I-1659, scale 1:5,000,000.
- Trask, N.J., and Dzurisin, Daniel, 1984, Geologic map of the Discovery quadrangle of Mercury: U.S. Geological Survey Miscellaneous Investigations Series Map I-1658, scale 1:5,000,000.

H-1 Borealis (features)
H-5 Hokusai (features)	H-4 Raditladi (features)	H-3 Shakespeare (features)		H-2 Victoria (features)
H-10 Derain (features)	H-9 Eminescu (features)	H-8 Tolstoj (features)	H-7 Beethoven (features)	H-6 Kuiper (features)
H-14 Debussy (features)	H-13 Neruda (features)	H-12 Michelangelo (features)		H-11 Discovery (features)
H-15 Bach (features)
